= Wearable computer =

Small computing device worn on the body

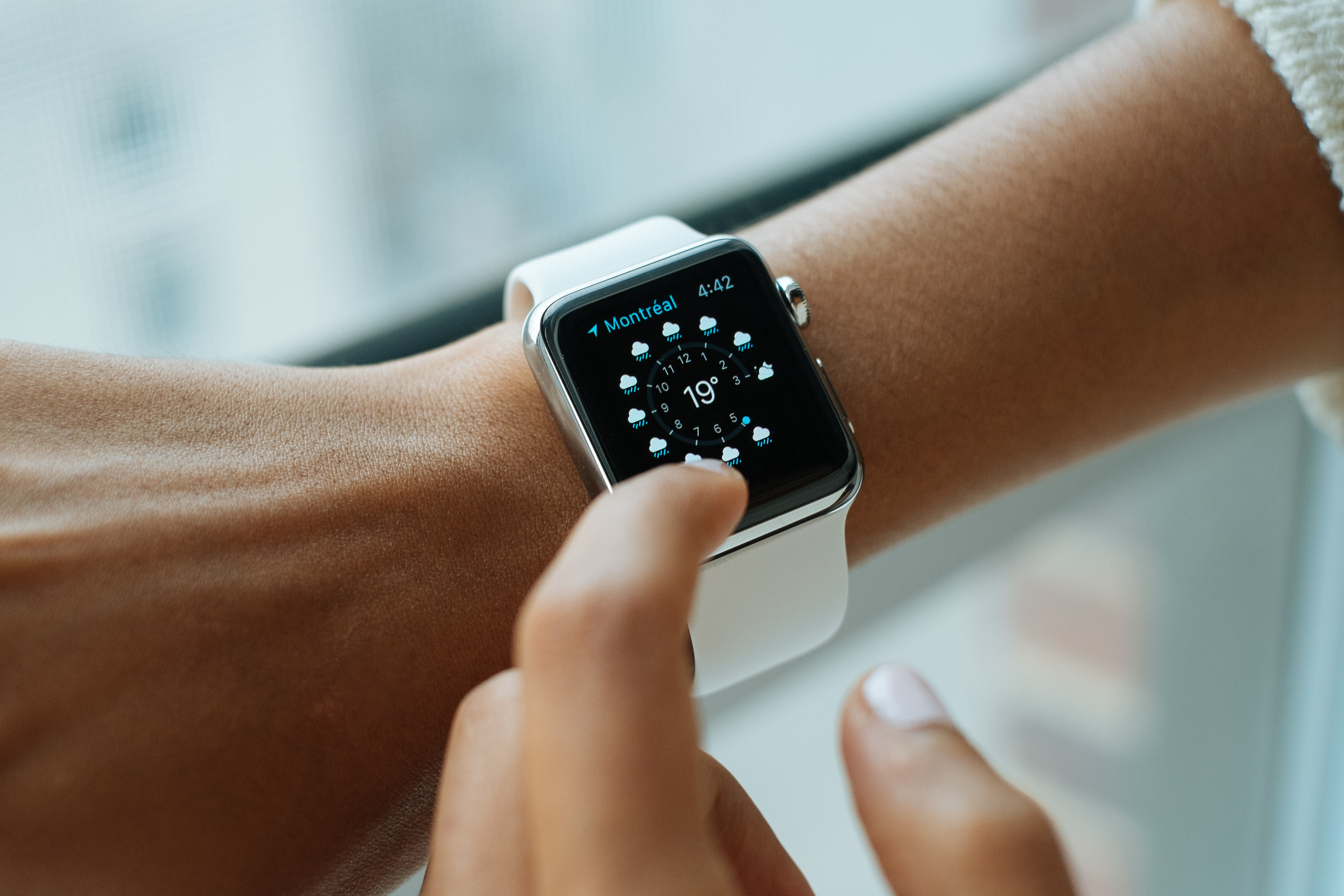
Smartwatches are an example of a wearable computer.

A wearable computer, also known as a body-borne computer or wearable, is a computing device worn on the body. The definition of 'wearable computer' may be narrow or broad, extending to smartphones or even ordinary wristwatches.

Wearables may be for general use, in which case they are just a particularly small example of mobile computing. Alternatively, they may be for specialized purposes such as fitness trackers. They may incorporate special sensors such as accelerometers, heart rate monitors, or on the more advanced side, electrocardiogram (ECG) and blood oxygen saturation (SpO2) monitors. Under the definition of wearable computers, we also include novel user interfaces such as Google Glass, an optical head-mounted display controlled by gestures. It may be that specialized wearables will evolve into general all-in-one devices, as happened with the convergence of PDAs and mobile phones into smartphones.

Wearables are typically worn on the wrist (e.g. fitness trackers), hung from the neck (like a necklace), strapped to the arm or leg (electronic tagging), or on the head (as glasses or a helmet), though some have been located elsewhere (e.g. on a finger or in a shoe). Devices carried in a pocket or bag – such as smartphones and before them, pocket calculators and PDAs, may or may not be regarded as 'worn'.

Wearable computers have various technical issues common to other mobile computing, such as batteries, heat dissipation, software architectures, Wireless and personal area networks, and data management. Many wearable computers are active all the time, e.g. processing or recording data continuously.

== Applications ==
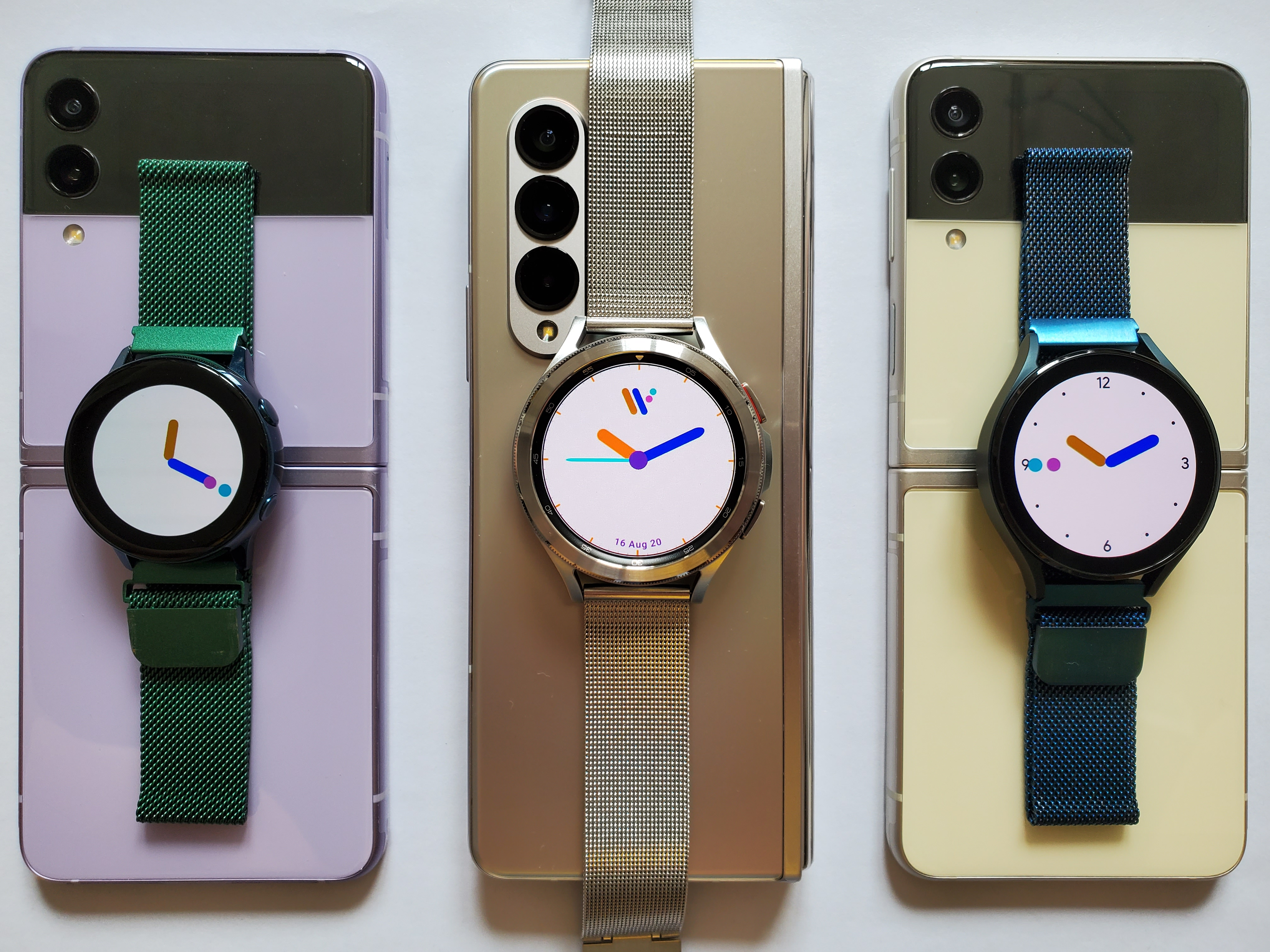
Samsung Galaxy smartphones and Samsung Galaxy Watch smartwatches

Wearable computers are not only limited to computers such as fitness trackers that are worn on wrists; they also include wearables such as heart pacemakers and other prosthetics. They are used most often in research that focuses on behavioral modeling, health monitoring systems, IT and media development, where the person wearing the computer actually moves or is otherwise engaged with his or her surroundings. Wearable computers have been used for the following:

- general-purpose computing (e.g. smartphones and smartwatches)
- sensory integration, e.g. to help people see better or understand the world better (whether in task-specific applications like camera-based welding helmets or for everyday use like Google Glass)
- behavioral modeling
- health care monitoring systems
- service management
- electronic textiles and fashion design, e.g. Microsoft's 2011 prototype "The Printing Dress".

Wearable computing is the subject of active research, especially the form-factor and location on the body, with areas of study including user interface design, augmented reality, and pattern recognition. The use of wearables for specific applications, for compensating disabilities or supporting elderly people steadily increases.

== Operating systems ==
The dominant operating systems for wearable computing are:

- FreeRTOS is a real-time operating system kernel for embedded devices; most of the Smartbands that are currently available in the market are based on FreeRTOS, which include Huawei, Honor, Lenovo, realme, TCL and Xiaomi smartbands.
- LiteOS is a lightweight open source real-time operating system that is part of Huawei's "1+8+N" Internet of Things solution.
- Tizen OS from Samsung (there was an announcement in May 2021 that Wear OS and Tizen OS will merge and will be called simply Wear.)
- watchOS is a proprietary mobile operating system developed by Apple Inc. to run on the Apple Watch.
- Wear OS (previously known as Android Wear) is a smartwatch operating system developed by Google Inc.

== History ==
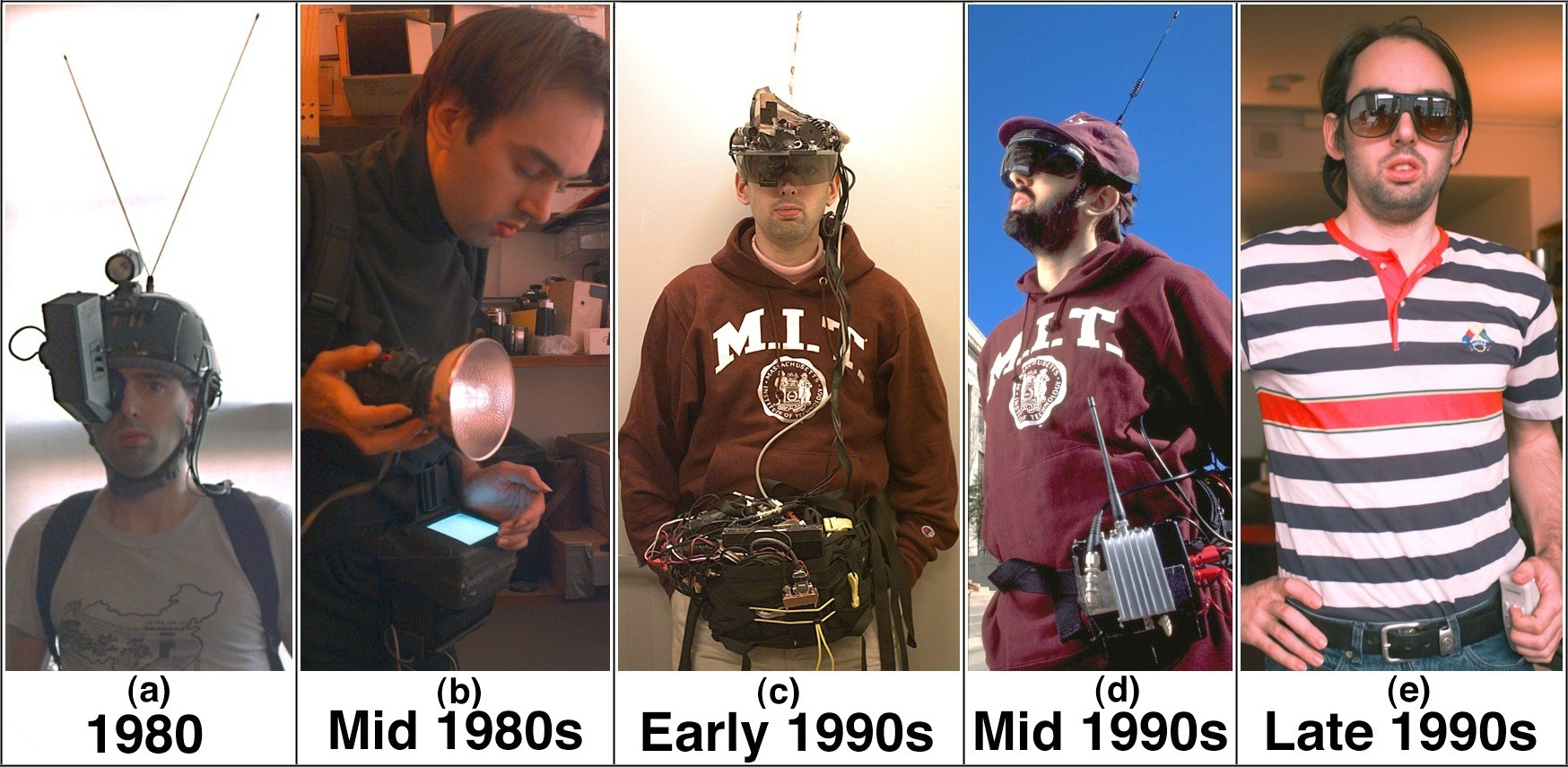
Evolution of Steve Mann's WearComp wearable computer from backpack based systems of the 1980s to his current covert systems

Due to the varied definitions of wearable and computer, the first wearable computer could be as early as the first abacus on a necklace, a 16th-century abacus ring, a wristwatch and 'finger-watch' owned by Queen Elizabeth I of England, or the covert timing devices hidden in shoes to cheat at roulette by Thorp and Shannon in the 1960s and 1970s.

However, a general-purpose computer is not merely a time-keeping or calculating device, but rather a user-programmable item for arbitrary complex algorithms, interfacing, and data management. By this definition, the wearable computer was invented by Steve Mann, in the late 1970s:

Steve Mann, a professor at the University of Toronto, was hailed as the father of the wearable computer and the ISSCC's first virtual panelist, by moderator Woodward Yang of Harvard University (Cambridge Mass.).

— IEEE ISSCC 8 Feb. 2000

The development of wearable items has taken several steps of miniaturization from discrete electronics over hybrid designs to fully integrated designs, where just one processor chip, a battery, and some interface conditioning items make the whole unit.

=== 1500s ===
Queen Elizabeth I of England received a watch from Robert Dudley in 1571, as a New Year's present; it may have been worn on the forearm rather than the wrist. She also possessed a 'finger-watch' set in a ring, with an alarm that prodded her finger.

=== 1600s ===
The Qing dynasty saw the introduction of a fully functional abacus on a ring, which could be used while it was being worn.

=== 1960s ===
In 1961, mathematicians Edward O. Thorp and Claude Shannon built some computerized timing devices to help them win a game of roulette. One such timer was concealed in a shoe and another in a pack of cigarettes. Various versions of this apparatus were built in the 1960s and 1970s.

Thorp refers to himself as the inventor of the first "wearable computer". In other variations, the system was a concealed cigarette-pack-sized analog computer designed to predict the motion of roulette wheels. A data-taker would use microswitches hidden in his shoes to indicate the speed of the roulette wheel, and the computer would indicate an octant of the roulette wheel to bet on by sending musical tones via radio to a miniature speaker hidden in a collaborator's ear canal. The system was successfully tested in Las Vegas in June 1961, but hardware issues with the speaker wires prevented it from being used beyond test runs. This was not a wearable computer because it could not be re-purposed during use; rather it was an example of task-specific hardware. This work was kept secret until it was first mentioned in Thorp's book Beat the Dealer (revised ed.) in 1966 and later published in detail in 1969.

=== 1970s ===
Pocket calculators became mass-market devices in 1970, starting in Japan. Programmable calculators followed in the late 1970s, being somewhat more general-purpose computers. The HP-01 algebraic calculator watch by Hewlett-Packard was released in 1977.

A camera-to-tactile vest for the blind, launched by C.C. Collins in 1977, converted images into a 1024-point, ten-inch square tactile grid on a vest.

=== 1980s ===
The 1980s saw the rise of more general-purpose wearable computers. In 1981, Steve Mann designed and built a backpack-mounted 6502-based wearable multimedia computer with text, graphics, and multimedia capability, as well as video capability (cameras and other photographic systems). Mann went on to be an early and active researcher in the wearables field, especially known for his 1994 creation of the Wearable Wireless Webcam, the first example of lifelogging.

Seiko Epson released the RC-20 Wrist Computer in 1984. It was an early smartwatch, powered by a computer on a chip.

In 1989, Reflection Technology marketed the Private Eye head-mounted display, which scans a vertical array of LEDs across the visual field using a vibrating mirror. This display gave rise to several hobbyist and research wearables, including Gerald "Chip" Maguire's IBM/Columbia University Student Electronic Notebook, Doug Platt's Hip-PC, and Carnegie Mellon University's VuMan 1 in 1991.

The Student Electronic Notebook consisted of the Private Eye, Toshiba diskless AIX notebook computers (prototypes), a stylus based input system and a virtual keyboard. It used direct-sequence spread spectrum radio links to provide all the usual TCP/IP based services, including NFS mounted file systems and X11, which all ran in the Andrew Project environment.

The Hip-PC included an Agenda palmtop used as a chording keyboard attached to the belt and a 1.44 megabyte floppy drive. Later versions incorporated additional equipment from Park Engineering. The system debuted at "The Lap and Palmtop Expo" on 16 April 1991.

VuMan 1 was developed as part of a Summer-term course at Carnegie Mellon's Engineering Design Research Center, and was intended for viewing house blueprints. Input was through a three-button unit worn on the belt, and output was through Reflection Tech's Private Eye. The CPU was an 8 MHz 80188 processor with 0.5 MB ROM.

=== 1990s ===
In the 1990s PDAs became widely used, and in 1999 were combined with mobile phones in Japan to produce the first mass-market smartphone.

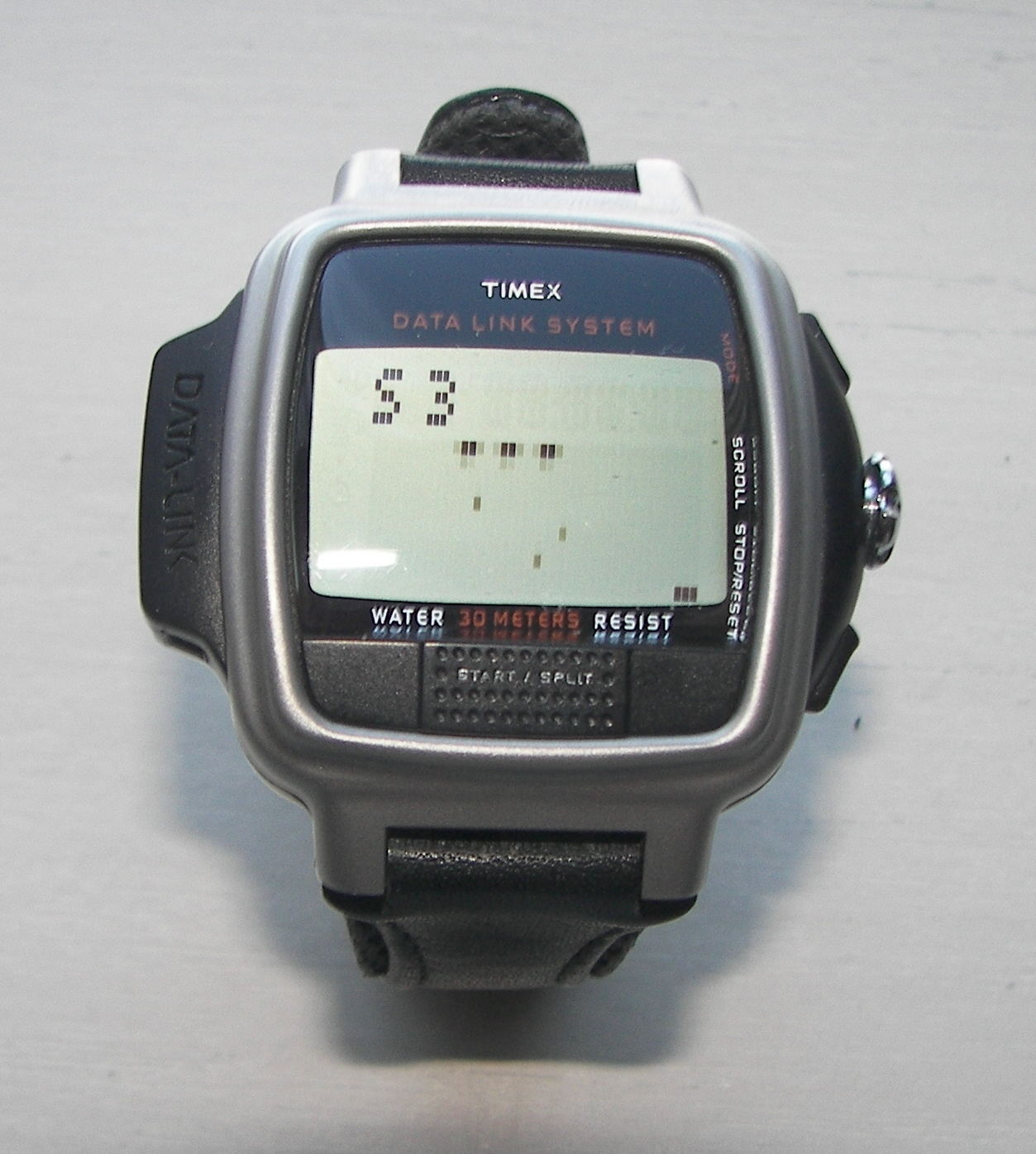
Timex Datalink USB Dress edition with Invasion video game. The watch crown (icontrol) can be used to move the defender left to right and the fire control is the Start/Split button on the lower side of the face of the watch at 6 o' clock.

In 1993, the Private Eye was used in Thad Starner's wearable, based on Doug Platt's system and built from a kit from Park Enterprises, a Private Eye display on loan from Devon Sean McCullough, and the Twiddler chording keyboard made by Handykey. Many iterations later this system became the MIT "Tin Lizzy" wearable computer design, and Starner went on to become one of the founders of MIT's wearable computing project. 1993 also saw Columbia University's augmented-reality system known as KARMA (Knowledge-based Augmented Reality for Maintenance Assistance). Users would wear a Private Eye display over one eye, giving an overlay effect when the real world was viewed with both eyes open. KARMA would overlay wireframe schematics and maintenance instructions on top of whatever was being repaired. For example, graphical wireframes on top of a laser printer would explain how to change the paper tray. The system used sensors attached to objects in the physical world to determine their locations, and the entire system ran tethered from a desktop computer.

In 1994, Edgar Matias and Mike Ruicci of the University of Toronto, debuted a "wrist computer." Their system presented an alternative approach to the emerging head-up display plus chord keyboard wearable. The system was built from a modified HP 95LX palmtop computer and a Half-QWERTY one-handed keyboard. With the keyboard and display modules strapped to the operator's forearms, text could be entered by bringing the wrists together and typing. The same technology was used by IBM researchers to create the half-keyboard "belt computer. Also in 1994, Mik Lamming and Mike Flynn at Xerox EuroPARC demonstrated the Forget-Me-Not, a wearable device that would record interactions with people and devices and store this information in a database for later query. It interacted via wireless transmitters in rooms and with equipment in the area to remember who was there, who was being talked to on the telephone, and what objects were in the room, allowing queries like "Who came by my office while I was on the phone to Mark?". As with the Toronto system, Forget-Me-Not was not based on a head-mounted display.

Also in 1994, DARPA started the Smart Modules Program to develop a modular, humionic approach to wearable and carryable computers, with the goal of producing a variety of products including computers, radios, navigation systems and human-computer interfaces that have both military and commercial use. In July 1996, DARPA went on to host the "Wearables in 2005" workshop, bringing together industrial, university, and military visionaries to work on the common theme of delivering computing to the individual. A follow-up conference was hosted by Boeing in August 1996, where plans were finalized to create a new academic conference on wearable computing. In October 1997, Carnegie Mellon University, MIT, and Georgia Tech co-hosted the IEEE International Symposium on Wearables Computers (ISWC) in Cambridge, Massachusetts. The symposium was a full academic conference with published proceedings and papers ranging from sensors and new hardware to new applications for wearable computers, with 382 people registered for the event. In 1998, the Microelectronic and Computer Technology Corporation created the Wearable Electronics consortial program for industrial companies in the U.S. to rapidly develop wearable computers. The program preceded the MCC Heterogeneous Component Integration Study, an investigation of the technology, infrastructure, and business challenges surrounding the continued development and integration of micro-electro-mechanical systems (MEMS) with other system components.

In 1998, Steve Mann invented and built the world's first smartwatch. It was featured on the cover of Linux Journal in 2000, and demonstrated at ISSCC 2000.

=== 2000s ===
Dr. Bruce H. Thomas and Dr. Wayne Piekarski developed the Tinmith wearable computer system to support augmented reality. This work was first published internationally in 2000 at the ISWC conference. The work was carried out at the Wearable Computer Lab in the University of South Australia.

In 2002, as part of Kevin Warwick's Project Cyborg, Warwick's wife, Irena, wore a necklace which was electronically linked to Warwick's nervous system via an implanted electrode array. The color of the necklace changed between red and blue dependent on the signals on Warwick's nervous system.

Also in 2002, Xybernaut released a wearable computer called the Xybernaut Poma Wearable PC, Poma for short. Poma stood for Personal Media Appliance. The project failed for a few reasons though the top reasons are that the equipment was expensive and clunky. The user would wear a head-mounted optical piece, a CPU that could be clipped onto clothing, and a mini keyboard that was attached to the user's arm.

GoPro released their first product, the GoPro HERO 35mm, which began a successful franchise of wearable cameras. The cameras can be worn atop the head or around the wrist and are shock and waterproof. GoPro cameras are used by many athletes and extreme sports enthusiasts, a trend that became very apparent during the early 2010s.

In the late 2000s, various Chinese companies began producing mobile phones in the form of wristwatches, the descendants of which as of 2013 include the i5 and i6, which are GSM phones with 1.8-inch displays, and the ZGPAX s5 Android wristwatch phone.

=== 2010s ===
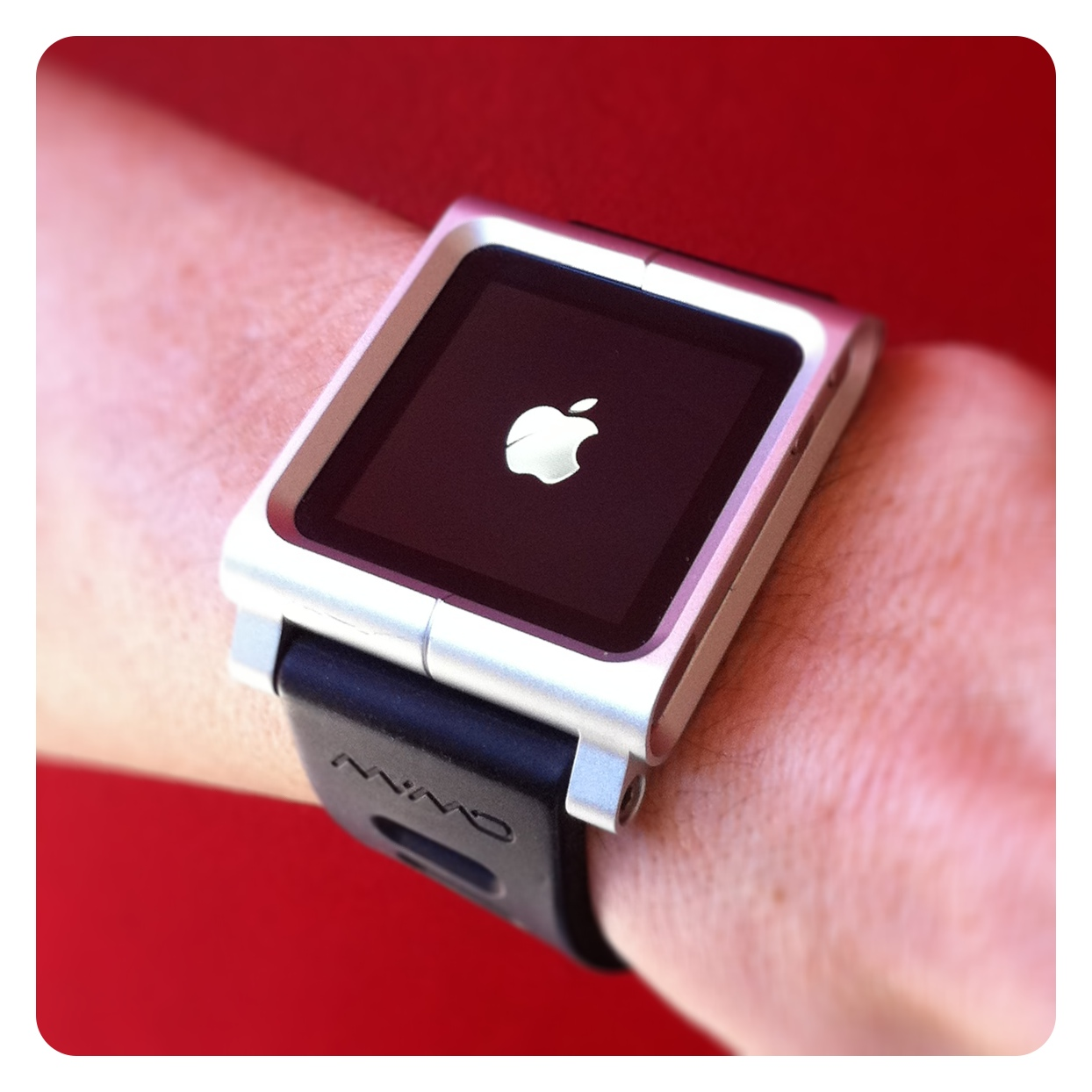
LunaTik, a machined wristband attachment for the 6th-generation iPod Nano

Standardization with IEEE, IETF, and several industry groups (e.g. Bluetooth) lead to more various interfacing under the WPAN (wireless personal area network). It also led the WBAN (Wireless body area network) to offer new classification of designs for interfacing and networking. The 6th-generation iPod Nano, released in September 2010, has a wristband attachment available to convert it into a wearable wristwatch computer.

The development of wearable computing spread to encompass rehabilitation engineering, ambulatory intervention treatment, life guard systems, and defense wearable systems.

Sony produced a wristwatch called Sony SmartWatch that must be paired with an Android phone. Once paired, it becomes an additional remote display and notification tool.

Fitbit released several wearable fitness trackers and the Fitbit Surge, a full smartwatch that is compatible with Android and iOS.

On 11 April 2012, Pebble launched a Kickstarter campaign to raise $100,000 for their initial smartwatch model. The campaign ended on 18 May with $10,266,844, over 100 times the fundraising target. Pebble released several smartwatches, including the Pebble Time and the Pebble Round. In 2013, LifeBEAM launched a smart bicycle helmet.

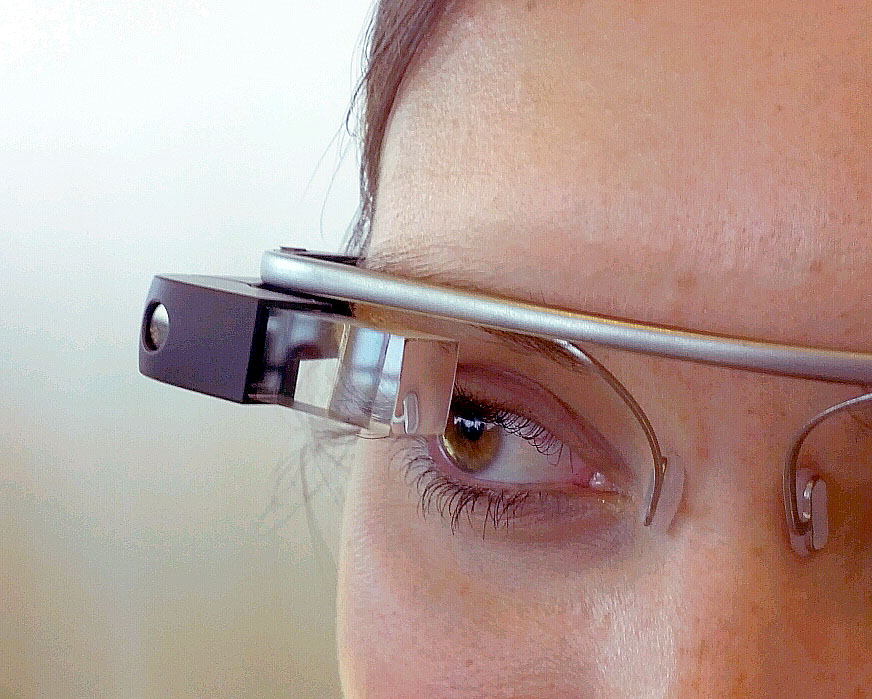
Google Glass, Google's head-mounted display, which was launched in 2013

Google Glass launched their optical head-mounted display (OHMD) to a test group of users in 2013, before it became available to the public on 15 May 2014. Google's mission was to produce a mass-market ubiquitous computer that displays information in a smartphone-like hands-free format that can interact with the Internet via natural language voice commands. Google Glass received criticism over privacy and safety concerns. On 15 January 2015, Google announced that it would stop producing the Google Glass prototype but would continue to develop the product. According to Google, Project Glass was ready to "graduate" from Google X, the experimental phase of the project.

Thync, a headset launched in 2014, is a wearable that stimulates the brain with mild electrical pulses, causing the wearer to feel energized or calm based on input into a phone app. The device is attached to the temple and to the back of the neck with an adhesive strip.

Macrotellect launched two portable brainwave (EEG) sensing devices, BrainLink Pro and BrainLink Lite in 2014, which allows families and meditation students to enhance the mental fitness and stress relief with 20+ brain fitness enhancement Apps on Apple and Android App Stores.

In January 2015, Intel announced the sub-miniature Intel Curie for wearable applications, based on its Intel Quark platform. As small as a button, it features a six-axis accelerometer, a DSP sensor hub, a Bluetooth LE unit, and a battery charge controller. It was scheduled to ship in the second half of the year.

On 24 April 2015, Apple released their take on the smartwatch, known as the Apple Watch. The Apple Watch features a touchscreen, many applications, and a heart-rate sensor. The Apple Watch would later become the most popular wristwatch in the world.

Certain virtual reality systems require the user to wear a backpack containing a computer, in addition to the headset, in order to allow freedom of movement while retaining necessary computational capabilities.

=== 2020s ===
On June 5, 2023, Apple unveiled the Vision Pro, an AR headset with a computer built in that has a screen on the front, allowing others to see the wearer's face.

== Commercialization ==
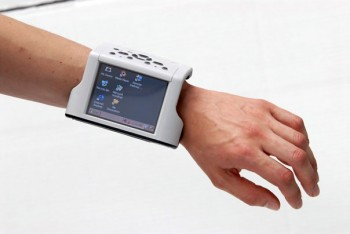
Image of the ZYPAD wrist wearable computer from Eurotech

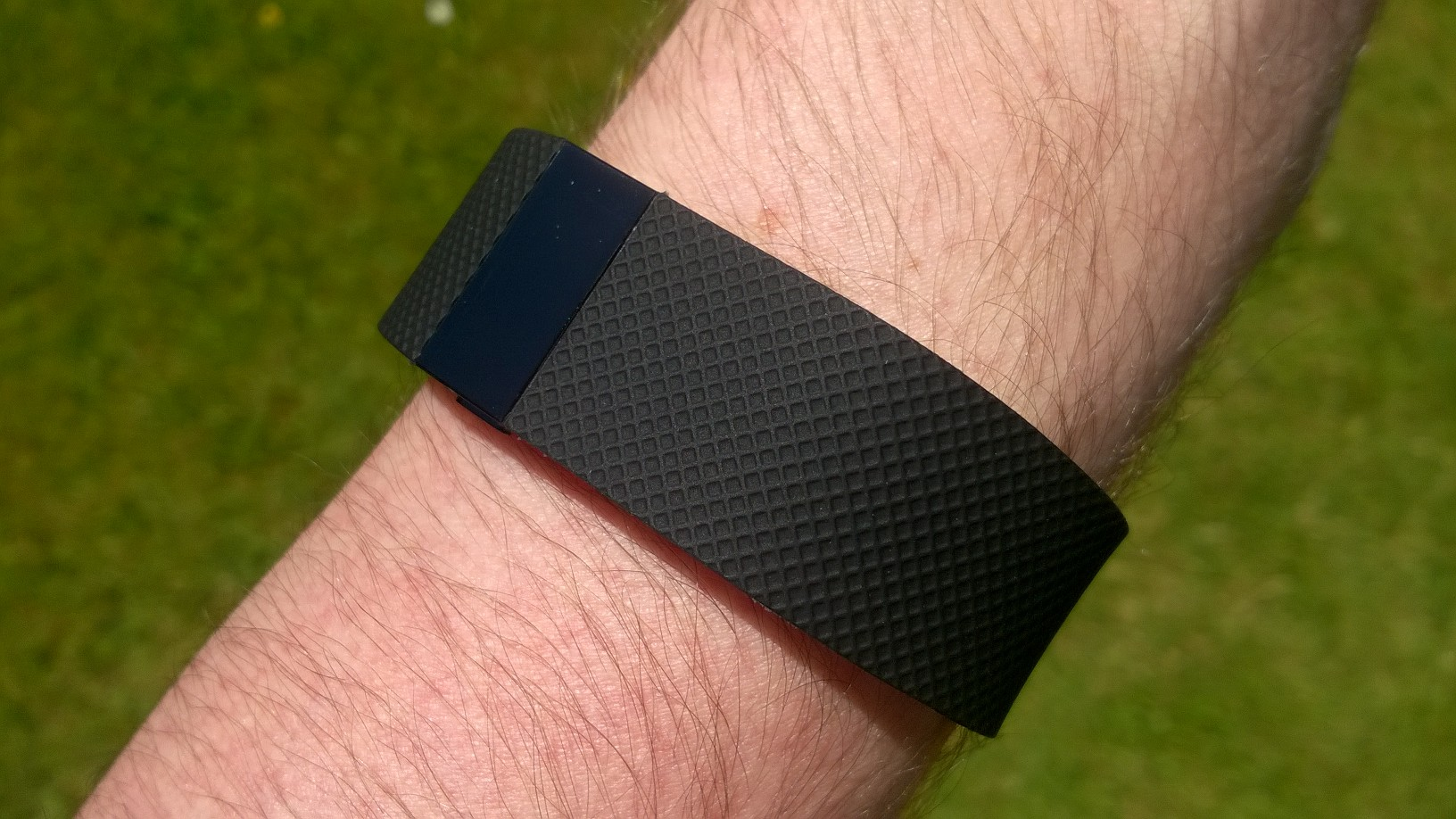
The Fitbit Charge

The commercialization of general-purpose wearable computers, as led by companies such as Xybernaut, CDI and ViA, Inc. has thus far been met with limited success. Publicly traded Xybernaut tried forging alliances with companies such as IBM and Sony in order to make wearable computing widely available, and managed to get their equipment seen on such shows as The X-Files, but in 2005 their stock was delisted and the company filed for Chapter 11 bankruptcy protection amid financial scandal and federal investigation. Xybernaut emerged from bankruptcy protection in January, 2007. ViA, Inc. filed for bankruptcy in 2001 and subsequently ceased operations.

In 1998, Seiko marketed the Ruputer, a computer in a (fairly large) wristwatch, to mediocre returns. In 2001, IBM developed and publicly displayed two prototypes for a wristwatch computer running Linux. The last message about them dates to 2004, saying the device would cost about $250, but it is still under development. In 2002, Fossil, Inc. announced the Fossil Wrist PDA, which ran the Palm OS. Its release date was set for summer of 2003, but was delayed several times and was finally made available on 5 January 2005. Timex Datalink is another example of a practical wearable computer. Hitachi launched a wearable computer called Poma in 2002. Eurotech offers the ZYPAD, a wrist-wearable touch screen computer with GPS, Wi-Fi and Bluetooth connectivity and which can run a number of custom applications. In 2013, a wearable computing device on the wrist to control body temperature was developed at MIT.

Evidence of weak market acceptance was demonstrated when Panasonic Computer Solutions Company's product failed. Panasonic has specialized in mobile computing with their Toughbook line since 1996 and has extensive market research into the field of portable, wearable computing products. In 2002, Panasonic introduced a wearable brick computer coupled with a handheld or a touchscreen worn on the arm. The "Brick" Computer is the CF-07 Toughbook, dual batteries, screen used same batteries as the base, 800 x 600 resolution, optional GPS and WWAN. Has one M-PCI slot and one PCMCIA slot for expansion. CPU used is a 600 MHz Pentium 3 factory under clocked to 300 MHz so it can stay cool passively as it has no fan. Micro DIM RAM is upgradeable. The screen can be used wirelessly on other computers. The brick would communicate wirelessly to the screen, and concurrently the brick would communicate wirelessly out to the internet or other networks. The wearable brick was quietly pulled from the market in 2005, while the screen evolved to a thin client touchscreen used with a handstrap.

Google has announced that it has been working on a head-mounted display-based wearable "augmented reality" device called Google Glass. An early version of the device was available to the US public from April 2013 until January 2015. Despite ending sales of the device through their Explorer Program, Google has stated that they plan to continue developing the technology.

LG and iriver produce earbud wearables measuring heart rate and other biometrics, as well as various activity metrics.

Greater response to commercialization has been found in creating devices with designated purposes rather than all-purpose. One example is the WSS1000. The WSS1000 is a wearable computer designed to make the work of inventory employees easier and more efficient. The device allows workers to scan the barcode of items and immediately enter the information into the company system. This removed the need for carrying a clipboard, removed error and confusion from hand written notes, and allowed workers the freedom of both hands while working; the system improves accuracy as well as efficiency.

== Popular culture ==
Many technologies for wearable computers derive their ideas from science fiction. There are many examples of ideas from popular movies that have become technologies or are technologies currently being developed.

3D user interface
Devices that display usable, tactile interfaces that can be manipulated in front of the user. Examples include the glove-operated hologram computer featured at the Pre-Crime headquarters in the beginning of Minority Report and the computers used by the gate workers at Zion in The Matrix trilogy.
Intelligent textiles or smartwear
Clothing that can relay and collect information. Examples include Tron and its sequel, and also many sci-fi military films.
Threat glasses
Scan others in vicinity and assess threat-to-self level. Examples include Terminator 2, 'Threep' Technology in Lock-In, and Kill switch.
Computerized contact lenses
Special contact lenses that are used to confirm one's identity. Used in Mission Impossible 4.
Combat suit armor
A wearable exoskeleton that provides protection to its wearer and is typically equipped with powerful weapons and a computer system. Examples include numerous Iron Man suits, the Predator suit, along with Samus Aran's Power Suit and Fusion Suit in the Metroid video game series.
Brain nano-bots to store memories in the cloud
Used in Total Recall.
Infrared headsets
Can help identify suspects and see through walls. Examples include Robocop's special eye system, as well as some more advanced visors that Samus Aran uses in the Metroid Prime trilogy.
Wrist-worn computers
Provide various abilities and information, such as data about the wearer, a vicinity map, a flashlight, a communicator, a poison detector or an enemy-tracking device. Examples included are the Pip-Boy 3000 from the Fallout games and Leela's Wrist Device from the Futurama TV sitcom.
On-chest or smart necklace
This form-factor of wearable computer has been shown in many sci-fi movies, including Prometheus and Iron Man.

=== Advancement with wearable technology over years ===
Technology has advanced with continuous change in wearable computers. Wearable technologies are increasingly used in healthcare. For instance, portable sensors are used as medical devices which helps patients with diabetes to help them keep track of exercise related data. A number of people think wearable technology as a new trend; however, companies have been trying to develop or design wearable technologies for decades. The spotlight has more recently been focused on new types of technology that prioritize boosting efficiency in the wearer's daily life.

=== Main elements of wearable computers ===
- the display, which allows the user to see the work they do.
- the computer, which allows the user to run an application or access the internet
- the commands, which allows the user to control the machine.

=== Challenges with wearable computers ===
Wearable technology comes with many challenges, like data security, trust issues, and regulatory and ethical issues. After 2010, wearable technologies have been seen more as a technology focused mostly on fitness. They have been used with the potential to improve the operations of health and many other professions. With an increase in wearable devices, privacy and security issues can be very important, especially when it comes to health devices. The FDA considers wearable devices as "general wellness products". In the US, wearable devices are not under any federal laws, but regulatory law like Protected Health Information (PHI) is the subject to regulation which is handled by the Office for Civil Rights (OCR). The devices with sensors can create security issues as the companies have to be more alert to protect the public Likewise, the National Institute of Standards and Technology (NIST) has a code called the NIST Cyber Security Framework, but it is not mandatory.

Consequently, the lack of specific regulations for wearable devices, specifically medical devices, can increase the risk of threats and other vulnerabilities. For instance, Google Glass raised major privacy risks with wearable computer technology; Congress investigated the privacy risks related to consumers using Google Glass and how they use the data. The product can be used to track not only the users of the product but others around them, particularly without them being aware. Nonetheless, all the data captured with Google Glass was then stored on Google's cloud servers, giving them access to the data. They also raised questions regarding women's security as they allowed stalkers or harassers to take intrusive pictures of women's bodies by wearing the Glass without any fear of getting caught.

Wearable technologies like smart glasses can also raise cultural and social issues. While wearable technologies can enhance convenience, some devices, such as Bluetooth headphones, may contribute to increased reliance on technology over interpersonal interactions. Society considers these technologies luxury accessories and there may be peer pressure within a group to own similar products. These products raise challenges of social and moral discipline. For instance, wearing a smart watch can be a way to fit in with standards in male-dominated fields, where femininity may be perceived as unprofessional.

Despite the fact that the demand for this technology is increasing, one of the biggest challenges is the price. As of March 2023, the price of an Apple Watch ranges from $249 to $1,749, which for a normal consumer can be prohibitively expensive.

=== Future innovations ===
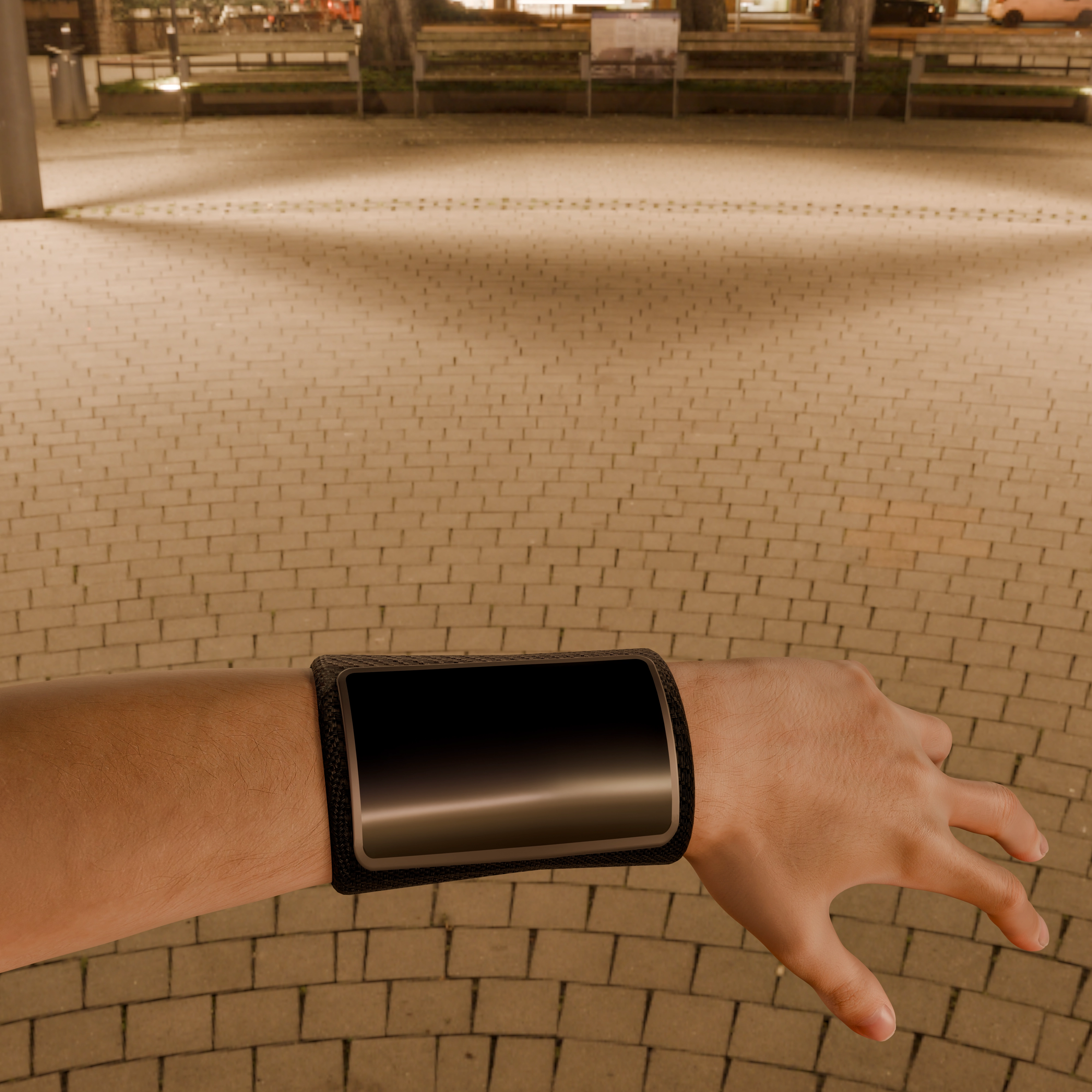
3D design of a wristband computer

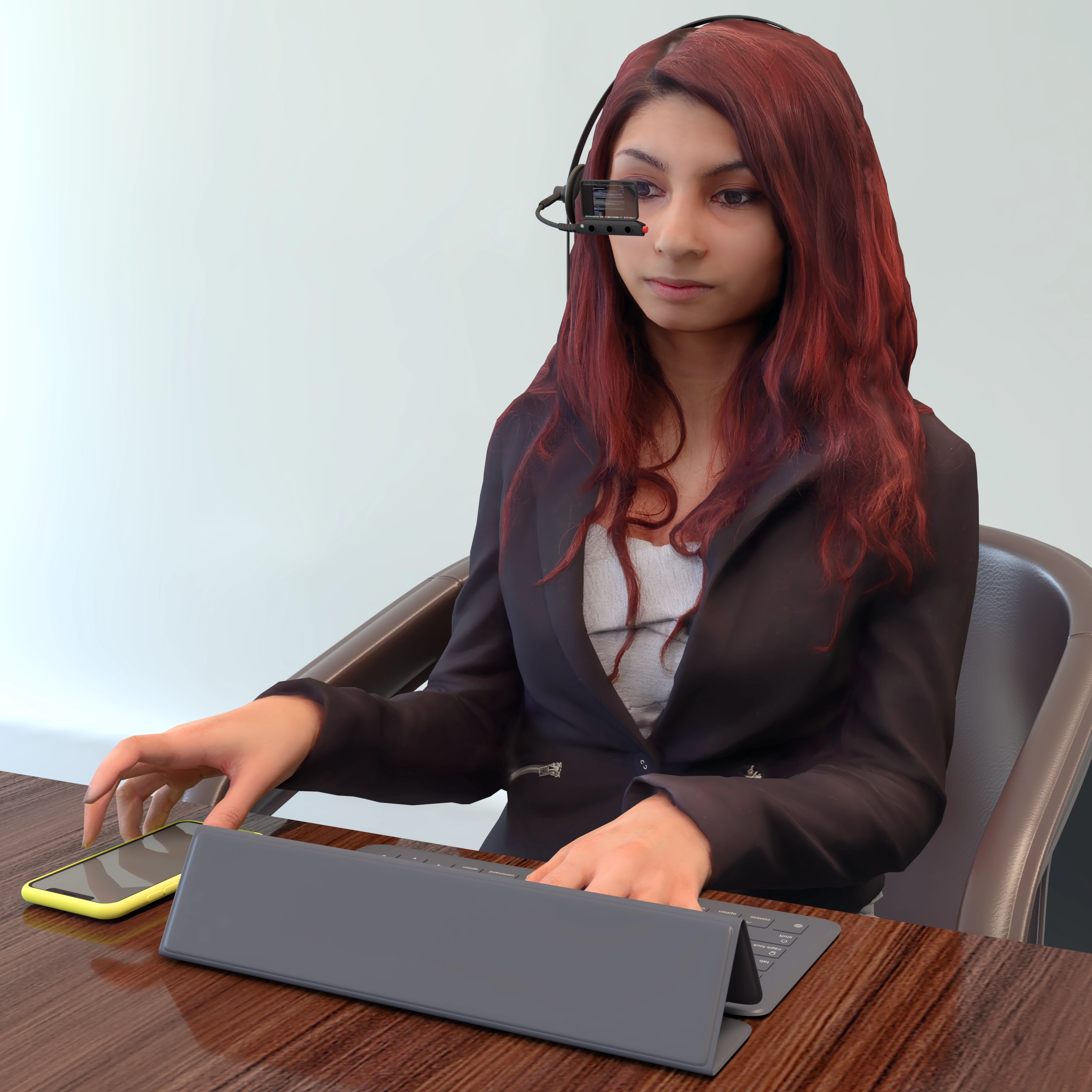
Headset computer

Augmented reality allows a new generation of display. As opposed to virtual reality, the user does not exist in a virtual world, but information is superimposed on the real world.

These displays can be easily portable, such as the Vufine+. Other are quite massive, like the Hololens 2. Some headsets are autonomous, such as the Oculus Quest 2 and others. In contrast to a computer, they are more like a terminal module.

Single-board computers (SBC) are improving in performance and becoming cheaper. Some boards are cheap such as the Raspberry Pi Zero and Pi 4, while others are more expensive but more similar to a normal PC, like the Hackboard and LattePanda.

One main domain of future research could be the method of control. Today computers are commonly controlled through the keyboard and the mouse, which could change in the future. For example, the words per minute rate on a keyboard could be statistically improved with a BEPO layout. Ergonomics could also change the results with split keyboards and minimalist keyboards (which use one key for more than one letter or symbol). The extreme could be the Plover and steno keyboard that allow the use of very few keys, pressing more than one at the same time for a letter.

Furthermore, the pointer could be improved from a basic mouse to an accelerator pointer.

The system of gesture controls is evolving from image control (Leap Motion camera) to integrated capture (ex-prototype AI data glove from Zack Freedman.) For some people, the main idea could be to build computers integrated with the AR system which will be controlled with ergonomic controllers. It will make a universal machine that can be as portable as a mobile phone and as efficient as a computer, additionally with ergonomic controllers.

== Military use ==
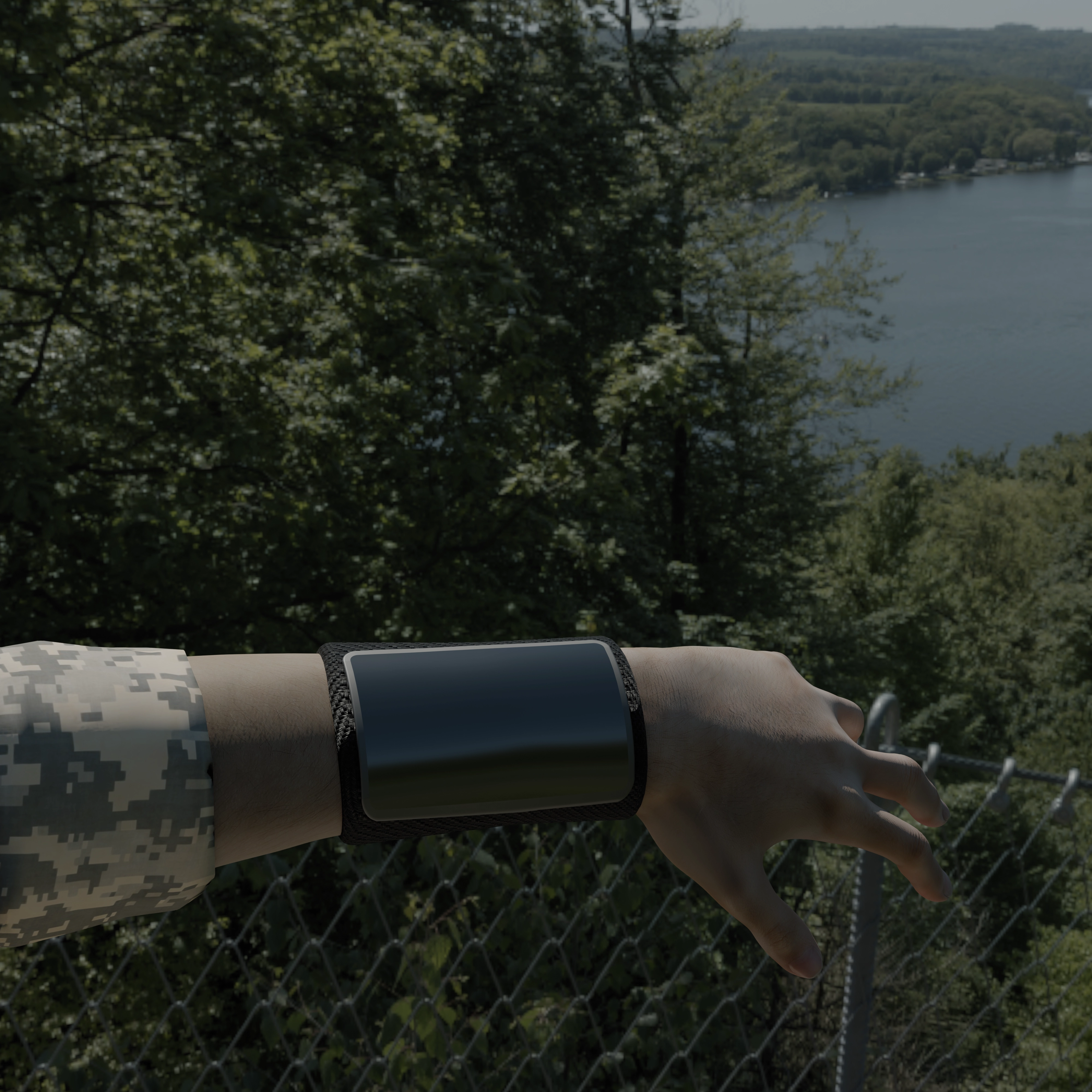
3D design of a wristband computer

The wearable computer was introduced to the US Army in 1989 as a small computer that was meant to assist soldiers in battle. Since then, the concept has grown to include the Land Warrior program and proposal for future systems. The most extensive military program in the wearables arena is the US Army's Land Warrior system, which will eventually be merged into the Future Force Warrior system. There are also researches for increasing the reliability of terrestrial navigation.

F-INSAS is an Indian military project, designed largely with wearable computing. The goal of F-INSAS is to equip soldiers with state-of-the-art technologies that improve their combat effectiveness, including wearable computers to aid in communication, navigation, and situational awareness.

== See also ==
- Activity tracker
- Apple Watch
- Artificial neural membrane (Smartskin)
- Augmented reality
- Active tag
- Calculator watch
- Computer-mediated reality
- eHealth
- EyeTap
- E-textiles
- Extended reality
- FrogPad
- Futuristic clothing
- Glove One
- Google Glass
- Golden-i
- GPS watch
- Head-mounted display
- Head-up display
- Heart rate monitor
- Internet of Things
- Lifelog
- Open-source computing hardware
- Identity tag
- Mixed reality
- Mobile phone
- Mobile interaction
- Optical head-mounted display
- OQO
- Personal digital assistant
- Pocket computer
- Ray-Ban Meta
- Skully (helmet)
- Smartphone
- Smartglasses
- Smartwatch
- Spatial computing
- Staff locators
- Tablet PC
- Virtual retinal display
- Wireless ambulatory ECG
