= David Atienza =

Spanish physicist and materials scientist

Professor David Atienza Alonso
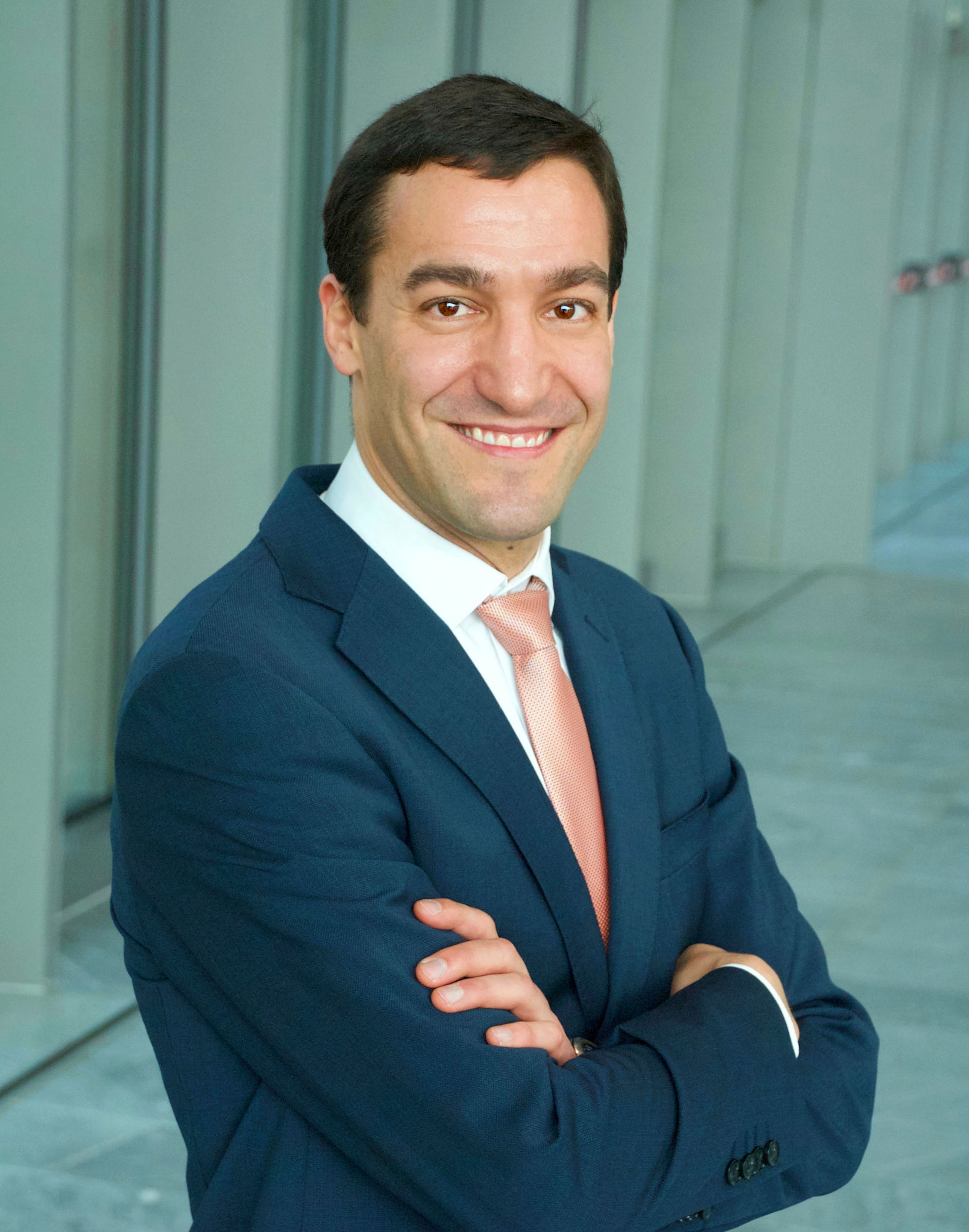
- David Atienza Alonso
- Born: 1978 (age 47–48); Madrid, Spain
- Citizenship: Spain, Switzerland
- Board member of: Associate Vice President of Centers and Platforms of EPFL (2024-); Chair of the EDAA (2022-2024); Director of the Section of Electrical Engineering of EPFL (2019–2022); President of IEEE CEDA (2018–2019); General Chair of DATE (2017); Technical Program Chair of DATE (2015); Gold Member of the Board of Governors IEEE CASS (2010–2012)

Academic background
- Education: Computer Engineering; Computer Architecture; Computer Science
- Alma mater: Complutense University of Madrid; IMEC, Leuven, Belgium
- Doctoral advisor: Francky Catthoor, and J. Mendias

Academic work
- Discipline: Engineering; Computer engineering Electronics
- Institutions: École Polytechnique Fédérale de Lausanne (EPFL)
- Main interests: Embedded systems Electronic design automation Low-power electronics Thermal management (electronics); Computer cooling Edge computing Wearable devices Data center Machine learning
- Website: https://www.epfl.ch/labs/esl/

David Atienza Alonso is a Spanish/Swiss scientist in the disciplines of computer and electrical engineering. His research focuses on hardware‐software co‐design and management for energy‐efficient and thermal-aware computing systems, always starting from a system‐level perspective to the actual electronic design. He is a full professor of electrical and computer engineering at the Swiss Federal Institute of Technology in Lausanne (EPFL), Associate Vice President of Research Centers and Platforms, and the head of the Embedded Systems Laboratory (ESL). He is an IEEE Fellow (2016), an ACM Fellow (2022) and an elected member of the Academia Europaea (Academy of Europe).

== Career ==
David Atienza studied computer science and engineering at Complutense University of Madrid (UCM) and gained his Bachelor's and M.Sc. degrees in 1999 and 2001, respectively. He then received an EU Marie Curie Scholarship to pursue a Ph.D. degree jointly from IMEC in Belgium and UCM in integrated circuit design and embedded systems design. After his graduation in 2005, he joined the Department of Computer Architecture and Engineering of UCM as an assistant professor, receiving the accreditation from the Spanish National Agency for Quality Assessment and Accreditation (ANECA) to become associate professor in late 2006 at UCM. He then became a tenure-track assistant professor at EPFL in 2008, an associate professor in early 2014, and a full professor since 2021. Since October 2024 he has been serving as the Associate Vice President (Associate Provost) of Research Centers and Platforms at EPFL.

== Research ==
At the Embedded Systems Laboratory of EPFL, Prof. David Atienza works on system-level design and management for energy-efficient computing systems. In particular, he investigates co-design and optimization approaches across the complete spectrum of computing systems, from high-performance multi-processor system-on-chip (MPSoC) servers and data centers to low-power Internet-of-Thing (IoT) systems and wearables. His contributions in these areas always target to go beyond hardware and software boundaries for efficient energy use by developing (1) new thermal‐aware optimization and run‐time management of 2D/3D multi‐processor servers and data centers, and (2) cross-layer design methodologies for ultra‐low power smart wearables, edge artificial intelligence (AI) and IoT systems. In these fields, he has co-authored more than 400 publications in peer-reviewed international journals and conferences, several book chapters, and 14 patents.

Prof. Atienza is a pioneer of innovative thermal-aware design and new cooling technologies for system-on-chip architectures. This includes working with IBM on the Microfluidics cooling of computer servers, allowing for multilayer stacks of 3D MPSoCs that can be simultaneously supplied with power and cooling through liquid media. A clear example of the long-term impact of Prof. Atienza in this area is the development of the 3D Interlayer Cooling Emulator (3D-ICE) tool, which was used in the design of Aquasar, the first chip-level water-cooled server by IBM. The different versions and updates of 3D-ICE have been available since 2012 as open-source for the research community in computer engineering and EDA tools, and is used for transient thermal modeling of 2D/3D MPSoC designs with multiple cooling technologies by numerous academic and industrial groups worldwide.

Prof. Atienza also works on smart embedded systems and edge computing for autonomous health monitoring and telemedicine. In this area, he has developed important contributions on methodologies for the design and optimization of energy-efficient and adaptive smart wearables and Internet-of-Things (IoT) systems. In particular, he developed a new generation of ultra-low-power and reconfigurable MPSoC architectures for smart wearables based on compressive sensing (in particular for real-time multi-lead ECG processing). Then, in the last years, he has proposed to enhance microcontroller-based architectures with HEAL-WEAR, a novel kernel processing accelerator based on coarse-grained Reconfigurable Array (CGRA) technology to enable multi-parametric smart wearables with edge artificial intelligence (AI) capabilities. This new MPSoC wearable architectures and the related AI algorithms for automatic bio-signal analysis and pathologies detection are licensed and used by a large number of providers of ambulatory, continuous, real-time outpatient management solutions. His current research in this area includes the engineering of next-generation ultra-low-power edge computing systems including emerging nanotechnologies, such as RRAM architectures.

Additional recent industrial applications of the work of Prof. Atienza in energy-efficient algorithms and smart embedded computing systems include research on navigational systems for ClearSpace-1, deep learning for Facebook's recommendation systems, and the latest capsule recognition technology used by Nespresso.

== Distinctions ==
As Prof. Atienza built up his academic reputation, he was awarded an Oracle External Research Faculty Award (2011), the SIGDA ACM Outstanding New Faculty Award (2012) (first case ever awarded outside the USA), and the IEEE CEDA Early Career Award (2013). He was appointed Editor-in-Chief of IEEE Transactions on Computer-Aided Design of Integrated Circuits and Systems (TCAD) in the period 2022–2023.

His achievements as professor at EPFL were recognised, among others, with an ERC Consolidator Grant (2016), the IEEE Technical Committee on Cyber-Physical Systems (CPS) Mid-Career Award (2018), the DAC Under-40 Innovators Award (2018), the ICCAD 10-Year Most Influential Paper Award (2020). and the CODES+ISSS Test of time Award at the Embedded Systems Week (2024).

In 2016, Prof. Atienza was named IEEE Fellow for "his contributions to design methods and tools for MPSoCs".

Also, in 2022, he was recognized as an ACM Fellow for "contributions to the design of high-performance integrated systems and ultra-low power edge circuits and architectures".

== Selected works ==
- Mamaghanian, Hossein; Khaled, Nadia; Atienza, David; Vandergheynst, Pierre (2011). "Compressed Sensing for Real-Time Energy-Efficient ECG Compression on Wireless Body Sensor Nodes" (PDF). IEEE Transactions on Biomedical Engineering. 58 (9): 2456–2466. Bibcode:2011ITBE...58.2456M. doi:10.1109/TBME.2011.2156795. PMID 21606019. S2CID 18750981.
- Rincon, Francisco; Recas, Joaquin; Khaled, Nadia; Atienza, David (2011). "Development and evaluation of multi-lead wavelet-based ECG delineation algorithms for embedded wireless sensor nodes". IEEE Transactions on Information Technology in Biomedicine. 15 (6): 854–863. Bibcode:2011ITITB..15..854R. doi:10.1109/TITB.2011.2163943. PMID 21827976. S2CID 12575612.
- Dogan, Ahmed; Constantin, Jeremy; Ruggiero, Martino; Burg, Andreas; Atienza, David (2012). Multi-Core Architecture Design for Ultra-Low-Power Wearable Health Monitoring Systems. Proc. of Design, Automation and Test in Europe (DATE '12). pp. 988–994. doi:10.1109/DATE.2012.6176640.
- Sridhar, Arvind; Vincenzi, Alessandro; Ruggiero, Martino; Atienza, David (2012). "Neural Network-Based Thermal Simulation of Integrated Circuits on GPUs". IEEE Transactions on Computer-Aided Design of Integrated Circuits and Systems. 31 (1): 23–36. Bibcode:2012ITCAD..31...23S. doi:10.1109/TCAD.2011.2174236. S2CID 2620837.
- Sridhar, Arvind; Vincenzi, Alessandro; Atienza, David; Brunschwiler, Thomas (2014). "3D-ICE: a Compact Thermal Model for Early-Stage Design of Liquid-Cooled ICs". IEEE Transactions on Computers. 63 (10): 2576–2589. Bibcode:2014ITCmp..63.2576S. doi:10.1109/TC.2013.127. S2CID 14988707.
- Duch, Loris; Basu, Soumya; Braojos, Ruben; Ansaloni, Giovanni; Pozzi, Laura; Atienza, David (2017). "HEAL-WEAR: An Ultra-Low Power Heterogeneous System for Bio-Signal Analysis". IEEE Transactions on Circuits and Systems I: Regular Papers. 64 (9): 2448–2461. Bibcode:2017ITCSR..64.2448D. doi:10.1109/TCSI.2017.2701499. S2CID 21830125.
- Iranfar, Arman; Zapater, Marina; Atienza, David (2018). "Machine Learning-Based Quality-Aware Power and Thermal Management of Multistream HEVC Encoding on Multicore Servers" (PDF). IEEE Transactions on Parallel and Distributed Systems. 29 (10): 2268–2281. Bibcode:2018ITPDS..29.2268I. doi:10.1109/TPDS.2018.2827381. S2CID 52196763.
- Pahlevan, Ali; Qu, Xiaoyu; Zapater, Marina; Atienza, David (2018). "Integrating Heuristic and Machine-Learning Methods for Efficient Virtual Machine Allocation in Data Centers" (PDF). IEEE Transactions on Computer-Aided Design of Integrated Circuits and Systems. 37 (8): 1667–1680. Bibcode:2018ITCAD..37.1667P. doi:10.1109/TCAD.2017.2760517. S2CID 12399628.
- Surrel, Gregoire; Aminifar, Amir; Rincon, Francisco; Murali, Srinivasan; Atienza, David (2018). "Online Obstructive Sleep Apnea Detection on Wearable Sensors" (PDF). IEEE Transactions on Biomedical Circuits and Systems. 12 (4): 762–773. doi:10.1109/TBCAS.2018.2824659. PMID 29993894. S2CID 51611525.
- Simon, William Andrew; Qureshi, Yasir Mahmood; Rios, Marco Antonio; Levisse, Alexandre Sébastien Julien; Zapater Sancho, Marina; Atienza, David (2020). "BLADE: An in-Cache Computing Architecture for Edge Devices" (PDF). IEEE Transactions on Computers. 69 (9): 1349–1363. Bibcode:2020ITCmp..69.1349S. doi:10.1109/TC.2020.2972528. S2CID 212980728.
- Thuwajit, Punnawish; Rangpong, Phurin; Sawangjai, Phattarapong; Autthasan, Phairot; Chaisaen, Rattanaphon; Sudhawiyangkul, Thapanun; Wilaiprasitporn, Theerawit; Atienza, David (2021). "EEGWaveNet: Multiscale CNN-Based Spatiotemporal Feature Extraction for EEG Seizure Detection". IEEE Transactions on Industrial Informatics. 18 (8): 5531–5540. doi:10.1109/TII.2021.3133307.
- Baghersalimi, Saleh; Teijeiro, Tomas; Atienza, David; Aminifar, Amir (2021). "Personalized Real-Time Federated Learning for Epileptic Seizure Detection". IEEE Journal of Biomedical and Health Informatics. 26 (2): 898–909. doi:10.1109/JBHI.2021.3096127. PMID 34242177.
- Ponzina, Flavio; Ansaloni, Giovanni; Peón-Quirós, Miguel; Atienza, David (2022). "Using Algorithmic Transformations and Sensitivity Analysis to Unleash Approximations in CNNs at the Edge". Micromachines. 13 (7): 1143. doi:10.3390/mi13071143. PMC 9320279. PMID 35888960.
- Pale, Una; Teijeiro, Tomas; Rheims, Sylvain; Ryvlin, Philippe; Atienza, David (2024). "Combining general and personal models for epilepsy detection with hyperdimensional computing". Artificial Intelligence in Medicine. 148 102754. arXiv:2303.14745. doi:10.1016/j.artmed.2023.102754. hdl:20.500.11824/1807. PMID 38325932.* Baghersalimi, Saleh; Amirshahi, Alireza; Forooghifar, Farnaz; Teijeiro, Tomas; Aminifar, Amir; Atienza, David (2024). "M2SKD: Multi-to-Single Knowledge Distillation of Real-Time Epileptic Seizure Detection for Low-Power Wearable Systems". ACM Transactions on Intelligent Systems and Technology. 15 (5): 1–22. doi:10.1145/3675402. hdl:20.500.11824/1938.
- Mallasén Quintana, David; Murillo, Raul; Botella, Guillermo; Del Barrio, Alberto; Atienza, David (2025). "Navigating Posit Arithmetic: A Comprehensive Survey of Principles, Hardware, and Applications". ACM Computing Surveys. 58 (5): 1–36. doi:10.1145/3772284.
