= Daos (software) =

Open-source storage platform

daos
- Original author: Intel
- Developers: HPE; Enakta Labs; Google
- Stable release: 2.8.0 / August 12, 2026; 42 days ago
- Written in: C++
- Type: Distributed object store
- Website: daos.io
- Repository: github.com/daos-stack/daos

DAOS is a free and open-source software-defined storage platform designed for high-performance computing and data-intensive workloads. DAOS originated from Intel-led R&D in 2012. The DAOS Foundation was launched with support from the Linux Foundation in 2023. The Argonne National Laboratory, operated by the University of Chicago, utilizes DAOS for storage in their Aurora supercomputer for climate simulation and radio astronomy. Phase 2 of the SuperMUC-NG supercomputer at the Leibniz Supercomputing Centre features a 1-petabyte DAOS filesystem that achieves 750 GB/s transfer speeds. Google Cloud's Parallelstore is based on DAOS.

DAOS is a high-bandwidth, low-latency, lock-free object storage platform that is most efficient for accessing small, unstructured data. Its baseline is a key-value-array store over which data models like POSIX namespaces and HDF5 datasets have been implemented.

== Release history ==
Release history
| Release version | First released |
|---|---|
| 1 | 3th April 2021 |
| 1.2 | 4th May 2021 |
| 2.0 | 22nd December 2021 |
| 2.2 | 6th October 2022 |
| 2.4 | 19th January 2024 |
| 2.6 | 25th July 2024 |
| 2.8 | Estimated Q1 2026 |

Legend:
Unsupported
Supported
Latest version
Future version
