= ZYPAD =

ZYPAD WL 1000
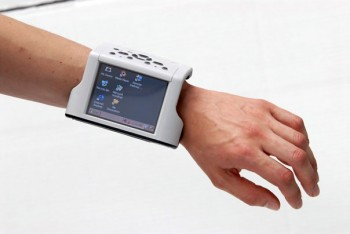
- The ZYPAD WL 1000
- Manufacturer: Eurotech / Parvus
- Type: Smartwatch, PDA
- Released: 2006
- Introductory price: ~$2000
- Operating system: Linux and Windows CE
- CPU: AU 1100 @ 400MHz
- Memory: Up to 64 MB RAM
- Storage: Up to 64 MB Flash
- Display: 320x240 (1/4 VGA) 256K Color 3.5" TFT
- Connectivity: GPS, USB, IRDA, Bluetooth, Wi-Fi 802.11 b/g
- Power: 3.6 V 2200 mAh Li-Ion (4 hour charge)
- Weight: 7 ounces (290g)
- Successor: ZYPAD WR 11XX

The ZYPAD is a PDA designed to be worn on a user's wrist like a bracer and offers interface port features similar to laptop computer. It was developed by Eurotech. It is arguable whether it qualifies as a watch, but it is referred to as a "Wrist Worn PC". It ships with Linux kernel 2.6 and also supports Windows CE 5.0, and can sense motion, allowing such possibilities of use such as going into standby mode when a user lowers his/her arm. It can determine its position by dead reckoning as well as via GPS. It supports Bluetooth, IrDA, and WiFi.

The ZYPAD debuted in 2006 and the ZYPAD WL 1000 was the first marketed device, followed by the WL 1100 with Windows CE 6.0 support. Initial retail prices were set to be around $2000. The Zypad WR1100 debuted in 2008 and features housing made out of high strength fiberglass-reinforced nylon-magnesium alloy and a biometric fingerprint scanner.
