= International Symposium on Wearable Computers =

Academic conference on wearable computers

The International Symposium on Wearable Computers (ISWC; pronounced "iz-wic") is one of the most prominent academic conferences on wearable computing and ubiquitous computing. Its first edition was held in 1997 in Cambridge, MA, USA. Since 2013, ISWC conferences have been held together alongside UbiComp, a Ubiquitous Computing conference. Proceedings from every edition are published by IEEE Press.

== Overview ==
ISWC conferences
Conference	Date	Place	Notes
ISWC 2025	October 14-16	Espoo, Finland	ACM Proceedings not yet available
ISWC 2024	October 5-9	Melbourne, Australia	ACM Proceedings, Held together with Ubicomp 2024 (a Ubiquitous Computing conference)
ISWC 2023	October 8-12	Cancún, Mexico	ACM Proceedings, Held together with Ubicomp 2023 (a Ubiquitous Computing conference)
ISWC 2022	September 11-15	(United States) Atlanta, GA, USA and Cambridge, United Kingdom	ACM Proceedings, Held together with Ubicomp 2022 (a Ubiquitous Computing conference)
ISWC 2021	September 21-26	Virtual Conference	ACM Proceedings, Held together with Ubicomp 2021 (the conference was held online)
ISWC 2020	September 12-17	Virtual Conference	ACM Proceedings, Held together with Ubicomp 2020 (the conference was held online)
ISWC 2019	September 11-13	London, United Kingdom	ACM Proceedings, Held together with Ubicomp 2019 (a Ubiquitous Computing conference)
ISWC 2018	October 8-12	Suntec City, Singapore	ACM Proceedings, Held together with Ubicomp 2018 (a Ubiquitous Computing conference)
ISWC 2017	September 13–15	(United States) Maui, HI, USA	ACM Proceedings, Held together with Ubicomp 2017 (a Ubiquitous Computing conference)
ISWC 2016	September 12–16	Heidelberg, Germany	ACM Proceedings, Held together with Ubicomp 2016 (a Ubiquitous Computing conference)
ISWC 2015	September 7–11	Osaka, Japan	ACM Proceedings, Held together with Ubicomp 2015 (a Pervasive Computing/Ubiquitous Computing conference)
ISWC 2014	September 13–17	(United States) Seattle, WA, USA	ACM Proceedings, Held together with Ubicomp 2014 (a Pervasive Computing/Ubiquitous Computing conference)
ISWC 2013	September 9–12	Zurich, Switzerland	Held together with a Pervasive Computing conference
ISWC 2012	June 18–22	(United Kingdom) Newcastle, UK	Held together with Pervasive 2012 (a Pervasive Computing conference)
ISWC 2011	June 12–15	(United States) San Francisco, USA	IEEE proceedings, Held together with Pervasive 2011 (a Pervasive Computing conference)
ISWC 2010	October 10–13	(South Korea) Seoul, Korea	IEEE proceedings
ISWC 2009	September 4–7	Linz, Austria	IEEE proceedings, Held together with Ars Electronica
ISWC 2008	October 11–13	(United States) Pittsburgh, PA, USA	IEEE proceedings
ISWC 2007	September 28 - October 1	(United States) Boston, MA, USA	IEEE proceedings
ISWC 2006	October 11–14	Montreux, Switzerland	IEEE proceedings
ISWC 2005	October 18–21	Osaka, Japan	IEEE proceedings
ISWC 2004	October 31 - November 3	(United States) Washington, DC, USA	IEEE proceedings
ISWC 2003	October 21–23	(United States) White Plains, NY, USA	IEEE proceedings
ISWC 2002	October 7–10	(United States) Seattle, WA, USA	IEEE proceedings
ISWC 2001	October 7–9	Zurich, Switzerland	IEEE proceedings
ISWC 2000	October 16–17	(United States) Atlanta, GA, USA	IEEE proceedings
ISWC 1999	October 18–19	(United States) San Francisco, CA, USA	IEEE proceedings
ISWC 1998	October 19–20	(United States) Pittsburgh, PA, USA	IEEE proceedings
ISWC 1997	October 13–14	(United States) Boston, MA, USA	IEEE proceedings
