= LifeBEAM =

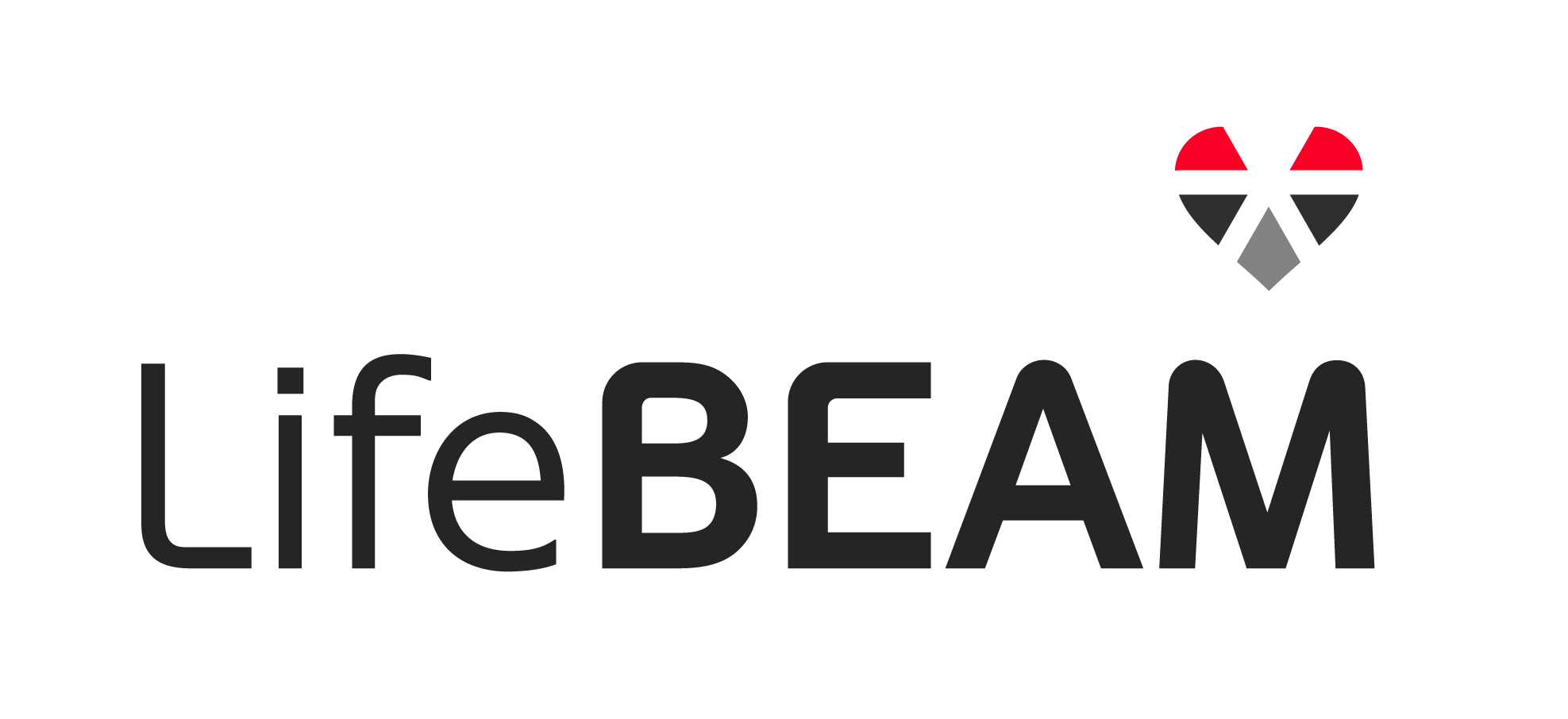
- Type: Incorporated
- Founded: 2011
- Founder: Omri Yoffe, Zvika Orron
- Number of locations: New York City
- Area served: Global
- Key people: Omri Yoffe, CEO

LifeBEAM, founded in 2011, is an artificial-intelligence wearables technology company. The technology was originally developed for monitoring pilots, astronauts and special forces through sensors in their helmets. It was then expanded to consumer fitness products, including artificially intelligent wearables, such as Vi.

== History ==
The company was founded in 2011 by air force former pilots, Omri Yoffe and Zvika Orron, looking for a way to improve pilot monitoring during the physical challenges of flying. Its first products tracked the heart rate and blood flow of air force pilots and astronauts, by embedding sensors in their helmets, as they pulled multiple Gs. Yoffe says the founders saw the need for the product because pilots sometimes died when they didn't have proper biometric data. Optical head sensors were chosen to not interfere with pilot performance. The Israeli Air Force helped test the technology.

The U.S. Air Force and NASA have used the products. The technology was adapted and licensed for wearables by Samsung and Under Armour, among others, before introducing consumer products.

The company has research and development centers in Los Angeles, Israel and Asia.

It raised $16 million in March 2016, bringing its total investment to $19 million.

== Consumer products ==
=== Artificially intelligent wearables ===
==== Vi ====
In June +2016, the company released the prototype of Vi, a wearable AI earphone personal training device that combines voice instructions with bio-sensors. The voice-activated digital assistant is similar to Apple's Siri with the fitness tracking features of Fitbit. The earbuds have sensors that track heart rate, heart rate variability and motion while running. Sensors also track weather, elevation, and location. Vi analyzes the data and provides real-time coaching based on fitness goals. It also chooses Spotify or Apple Music tracks that match the beats per minute of the recommended pace. The product was released to consumers in 2017.

A Kickstarter campaign for Vi ended in July 2016 with $1.68 million, making it the highest-funded campaign to date for a wearable.

=== Technology partnerships ===
LifeBEAM technology is embedded in the Samsung Simband platform for smart watches, Samsung's competitive platform to the Apple Watch. LifeBEAM's algorithms are used in Simband sensors, measuring heart rate, calories and steps. The platform became available in late 2014.

The technology powers the heart rate monitoring feature in Under Armour's Wireless Headphones, released at CES in January 2016. It also powers the 2XU Smart Hat, first reviewed in January 2016.

=== Helmet ===
In 2013, LifeBEAM used crowdsourced funding platform IndieGogo to fund a sensor-rich bicycle helmet. The helmet uses an optical sensor instead of an ECG chest strap to measure an athlete's heart rate. The data collected from the optical sensor is transmitted to a mobile phone or device using Bluetooth or ANT+ so that athletes can keep track of their heart rate in real time.

The LifeBEAM Smart Helmet has been reviewed in publications such as Gear Patrol, Cycling Tips, and Cycling Tech Review, and Gear Junkie.

The company further commercialized the product with the release of co-branded products with Lazer Helmets. The first edition was released in May 2014 and the second edition, the Lazer LifeBEAM 2.0, in December 2015.

=== Sports cap ===
The company offers a sports cap, the LifeBEAM Hat, released in November 2014, that provides biorhythm collection for runners by measuring heart rate, cadence and calories burned.

The LifeBEAM Hat has been reviewed in publications such as CNET, Time Magazine and Tom's Guide.

== Aerospace products ==
LifeBEAM technology is integrated into a helmet for pilots developed by Elbit that measures blood flow (including oxygen saturation) across a pilot's forehead, warning of impending G-LOC or hypoxiam, and switching to auto-pilot if the pilot loses consciousness or goes into hypoxia.

The optical technology is integrated into Elbit's smart helmets for F-16 pilots, released in June 2015, measuring blood flow (perfusion), pulse rate, and SpO2. Algorithms integrate the pilot's physiology, aircraft physics (G-forces, velocity, altitude & positioning) and the pilot's head & body posture to sense life-threatening problems and notify the air and ground crew.
