= Xybernaut =

Former American mobile computing company

Xybernaut Corporation
- Type: Technology
- Traded as: Nasdaq: XYBR
- Founded: 1990
- Headquarters: Chantilly, Virginia, U.S.
- Website: http://xybernaut.com/

Xybernaut Corporation was a maker of wearable mobile computing hardware, software, and services. Its products included the Atigo tablet PC, Poma wearable computer, and the MA-V wearable computer.

The company was headquartered in Fairfax, Virginia until 2006, when it moved to Chantilly, Virginia.

Although its first wearable computer, the Poma, created an initial stir when introduced in 2002, the slowness and disconcerting appearance of the product would land it on "worst tech fail" lists by the turn of the decade. Although surviving a bankruptcy, by 2017 Xybernaut had collapsed under financial scandal and regulatory and criminal strictures.

== Early history ==
The company was founded in 1990 as Computer Products & Services Incorporated (CPSI) by Edward G. Newman. In 1994, Newman's brother, Steven A. Newman, became the president of the company. The company had its Initial public offering in 1996 under the new name Xybernaut.

It subsequently posted 33 consecutive quarterly losses, despite repeated promises by the Newmans that profitability was right around the corner.

In mid-1998, former Virginia Governor George Allen joined the company's board of directors. He remained on the board until December 2000, resigning after he was elected a U.S. Senator the month before. In 1998 and 1999, McGuire Woods LLP, the law firm that Allen was a partner of, billed $315,925 to Xybernaut for legal work. Allen remained on the Xybernaut board until December 2000. He was granted 110,000 options of company stock that, at their peak, were worth $1.5 million, but he never exercised those options, which expired 90 days after he left the board.

In September 1999, the company's board dismissed its accounting firm, PricewaterhouseCoopers, which had issued a report with a "going concern" paragraph that questioned the company’s financial health. This was just one of many signs that the Newman brothers discouraged transparency in company accounting practices.

== Fraud charges and bankruptcy ==
In February 2005, Edward and Steven Newman were subpoenaed by the Securities and Exchange Commission about sales of Xybernaut stock. An internal company audit described improper conduct by the brothers including charging the company for personal expenses, hiring family members without SEC notification, failing to inform the company's board about large transactions, and interfering with internal audits. In April 2005, they were forced to resign. Following their ouster, the Board of Directors appointed Perry L. Nolen, previously president of Xybernaut's services subsidiary, as president and CEO of Xybernaut.

In July 2005, Xybernaut filed for bankruptcy reorganization. Xybernaut did have some success selling its technology to retail and hospitality customers such as grocery chain Tesco PLC, as well as government and military, including the U.S. Army. But Tim Shea, a senior analyst at Venture Development Corporation, said that "They've been sowing the seeds pretty well, but part of the problem is that they have this line of [wearable] products that were a little on the big and bulky side and had battery problems." In January 2007, Xybernaut emerged from bankruptcy protection, following a reorganization.

In October 2007, Edward and Steven Newman were indicted, along with Xybernaut's former General Counsel Martin Weisberg, for securities fraud and money laundering in federal district court in Brooklyn, New York. The indictment alleges, among other things, that the Newmans and Weisberg caused Xybernaut to issue hundreds of millions of Xybernaut shares at below market prices to two Israeli businessmen who, in turn, paid them millions of dollars in secret cash kickbacks. The Israeli businessmen, Zev Saltsman and Menachem Eiten, were also indicted and were awaiting extradition to the United States. Also included in the indictment is Andrew Broawn, the former president and CEO of Ramp, Inc. Investors who were fleeced by the company and its executives continued to wait for justice to be served and the Israeli businessmen extradited and the Newman brothers sent to prison.

In July 2010, Zev Saltsman reportedly entered a "guilty plea by settling parallel civil allegations" and had to forfeit $5 million by order of a judge. $4.5 million was set to be distributed to former shareholders of Xybernaut Corp. The arrangement settled his case with the Securities and Exchange Commission and the United States Attorney's Office and would not require his deportation. The additional monies would be used by the Xybernaut litigation fund to further legal action against other Xybernaut professionals who may have participated in illegal activities.

On January 25, 2017, a final judgment against Edward G. Newman was imposed. He received "a permanent injunction against future violations of certain antifraud provisions of the federal securities laws and bars Newman from serving as an officer and director of a public company."
