= ZGPAX s5 =

The ZGPAX S5 is a smartwatch from China. It is part of a set of products (including Omate TrueSmart) that use a similar chipset. The products in this set also have roughly the same specs but differ in names, case designs and camera placements.

== Specifications ==
For a time, they were considerably higher-spec than competing products from larger, well-known manufacturers in that they run a fully featured version of Android 4.0.3 and can run apps without the assistance of another connected smartphone or tablet. They use a dual-core ARMv7 processor manufactured by MediaTek, with each core running up to 1 GHz as needed. Additionally, a SIM slot for voice and data cellular connectivity is included, along with Bluetooth, Wi-Fi, GPS and FM radios, effectively replicating functionality and performance of a typical smartphone.

Another unique feature of ZGPAX S5 is a microSD slot which specs claim to support up to 32 GB of memory; however, it appears to recognize and operate with a 64 GB microSD. Along with its built-in memory, that amounts to very roughly 72 GB of data carried on a wrist.

There is a built in camera capable of adequate 720p recording, and a built in microphone and speaker which achieves decent enough fidelity and volume to function quite well with Siri-like software on Android.

== Technical issues ==
ZGPAX S5, like other smartwatches, suffer from a very short battery life. However, it (and many of its derivatives) use an easily swappable battery pack which helps considerably. Typical use life is about one day for maybe less than an hour of overall use, about 2–3 days if on standby. As it uses an unusually high-performance CPU for a watch, certain applications will drain the battery much quicker. Batteries charge roughly within an hour. There is also a known issue where the ZGPAX S5 will lose connection with the Network Operator at random, this is likely the cause of poor manufacturing of the ZGPAX S5's radio. Additionally, at random, phone calls to the watch may result in the watch restarting.
