= Philippe Ryvlin =

Neurologist and epilepsy researcherNeurologist and epilepsy researcher

Academic work
- Discipline: Neurology
- Sub-discipline: Epilepsy
- Institutions: University of Lausanne; Lausanne University Hospital; Claude Bernard University Lyon 1; University of Copenhagen

Philippe Ryvlin is a neurologist and epilepsy researcher. He is a professor of neurology at the University of Lausanne and an affiliated professor at the University of Copenhagen. He has headed the Department of Clinical Neurosciences at Lausanne University Hospital (CHUV) since 1 January 2015. His research concerns epilepsy surgery, sudden unexpected death in epilepsy (SUDEP), intracerebral electroencephalography (EEG), and wearable seizure detection. Ryvlin was the first author of MORTEMUS, a 2013 multinational study of cardiorespiratory arrests in epilepsy monitoring units. A 2017 review described the study as "a milestone in SUDEP research", and a 2023 bibliometric analysis identified it as the most-cited paper in its dataset of SUDEP publications. He is co-editor-in-chief, with Peter Goadsby, of Current Opinion in Neurology.

== Education and career ==
Ryvlin studied medicine in Paris from 1981 to 1987 and completed a neurology residency in Lyon from 1988 to 1994. He earned a master's degree in statistics and epidemiology in 1989 and a second master's degree in genetics and cytogenetics in 1993. From 1990 to 1991, he completed epilepsy fellowships at the Montreal Neurological Institute, the University of California, Los Angeles, and Zurich University Hospital. He received an MD and completed his specialist training in neurology in 1994, and completed a PhD in neuroscience in 1997.

He was a professor of neurology at Claude Bernard University Lyon 1 from 2000 to 2014. At the Hospices Civils de Lyon, he helped develop the epilepsy surgery programme and headed the Department of Functional Neurology and Epileptology in 2013–2014. He became a professor of neurology at the University of Lausanne in August 2014 and head of the Department of Clinical Neurosciences at CHUV on 1 January 2015. He has held an affiliated professorship in multimodal epilepsy surgery evaluation at the University of Copenhagen since January 2015.

== Research ==
A recurring theme of Ryvlin's clinical research has been drug-resistant focal epilepsy and its surgical treatment. A 2014 review co-authored by Ryvlin concluded that surgery is the most effective way to control seizures in carefully selected patients with drug-resistant focal epilepsy, while noting that high-level evidence for most presurgical investigations remained lacking. In a 2011 meta-analysis of 112 placebo-controlled trials of adjunctive antiepileptic drugs in refractory epilepsy, Ryvlin, Michel Cucherat and Sylvain Rheims found that definite or probable SUDEP was significantly less frequent among patients receiving efficacious drug doses than among those receiving placebo.

Ryvlin was the first author of the MORTEMUS study, published in The Lancet Neurology in 2013. It retrospectively surveyed cardiorespiratory arrests reported by epilepsy monitoring units in Europe, Israel, Australia and New Zealand in 2008–2009. The study identified 29 cardiorespiratory arrests: 16 SUDEP cases, nine near-SUDEP cases and four deaths from other causes. In the ten SUDEP cases with cardiorespiratory data, it found a recurring sequence after a generalised tonic-clonic seizure: rapid breathing followed by severe respiratory and cardiac dysfunction, with terminal apnoea preceding cardiac arrest. It estimated the incidence of SUDEP in adult monitoring units at 5.1 per 1,000 patient-years and concluded that closer supervision, particularly at night, was warranted. A 2017 review called MORTEMUS "a milestone in SUDEP research". A 2023 bibliometric analysis of 1,803 SUDEP-related publications from 2002 to 2022 identified MORTEMUS as the most-cited paper in its dataset.

Ryvlin has also worked on digital health and large-scale data sharing in epilepsy. Within the European Human Brain Project, he led the Medical Informatics Platform and co-led the Human Intracerebral EEG Platform, a cloud-based collaborative environment in which epilepsy centres can share data and analyse intracerebral EEG recordings using common software tools.

== Editorial work and awards ==
Ryvlin is co-editor-in-chief, with Peter Goadsby, of Current Opinion in Neurology, and was one of the founders of the journal Epileptic Disorders. In 2015, the International League Against Epilepsy presented him with its Ambassador for Epilepsy Award, which recognises outstanding international contributions to activities advancing the cause of epilepsy.
