= Glove One =

Glove One is a wearable mobile communications device created by Bryan Cera, a student of the University of Wisconsin–Milwaukee. The prototype is a 3D-printed wearable "gauntlet", that also functions as a usable cell phone. Glove One was presented at the Peck School of the Arts MA/MFA Thesis Exhibition in April, 2012.

== Overview ==
Glove One is a wearable cell phone that utilizes numbers on the inside of fingers to dial. Cera says that the “wearable mobile communication device” is also art, and describes it as "a cell phone which, in order to use, one must sacrifice their hand." The parts for Glove One were entirely 3D printed, and used both recycled electronics as well as custom-made circuits.

Cera states that plans for constructing a Glove One are in the future.
