= SuperMUC =

Supercomputer

Coordinates: 48.2617°N 11.6667°E

- Operators: Leibniz-Rechenzentrum
- Location: Garching, Germany
- Architecture: 19,252 Intel Xeon CPUs
- Operating system: SUSE Linux Enterprise Server
- Memory: 340 TB
- Storage: 15 PB
- Speed: 2.90 petaFLOPS
- Ranking: TOP500: 1. 44, November 2017
- Website: www.lrz.de/services/compute/supermuc/

SuperMUC was a supercomputer of the Leibniz Supercomputing Centre (LRZ) of the Bavarian Academy of Sciences. It was housed in the LRZ's data centre in Garching near Munich. It was decommissioned in January 2020, having been superseded by the more powerful SuperMUC-NG.

== History ==
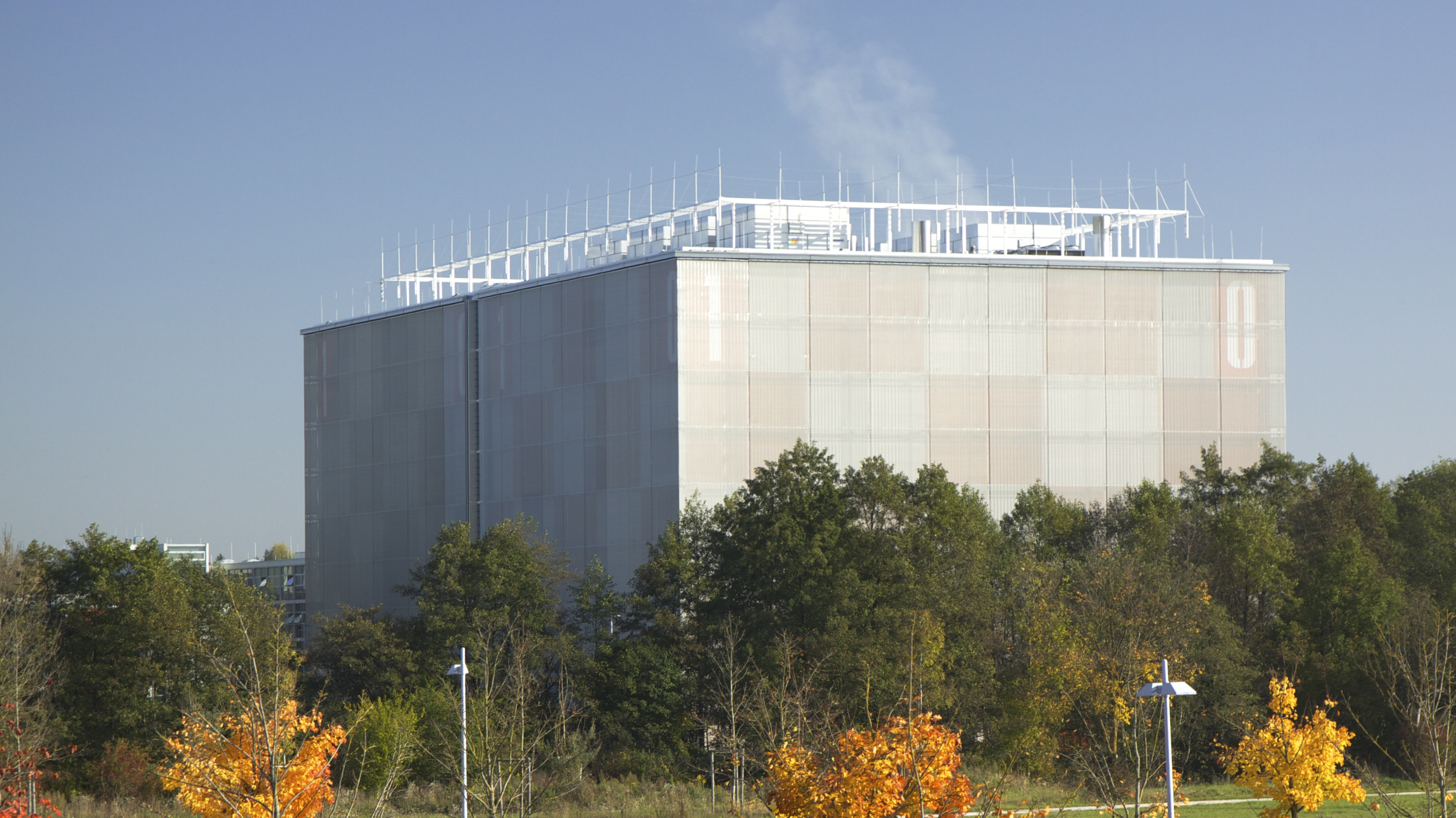
LRZ 'twin cube', housing SuperMUC

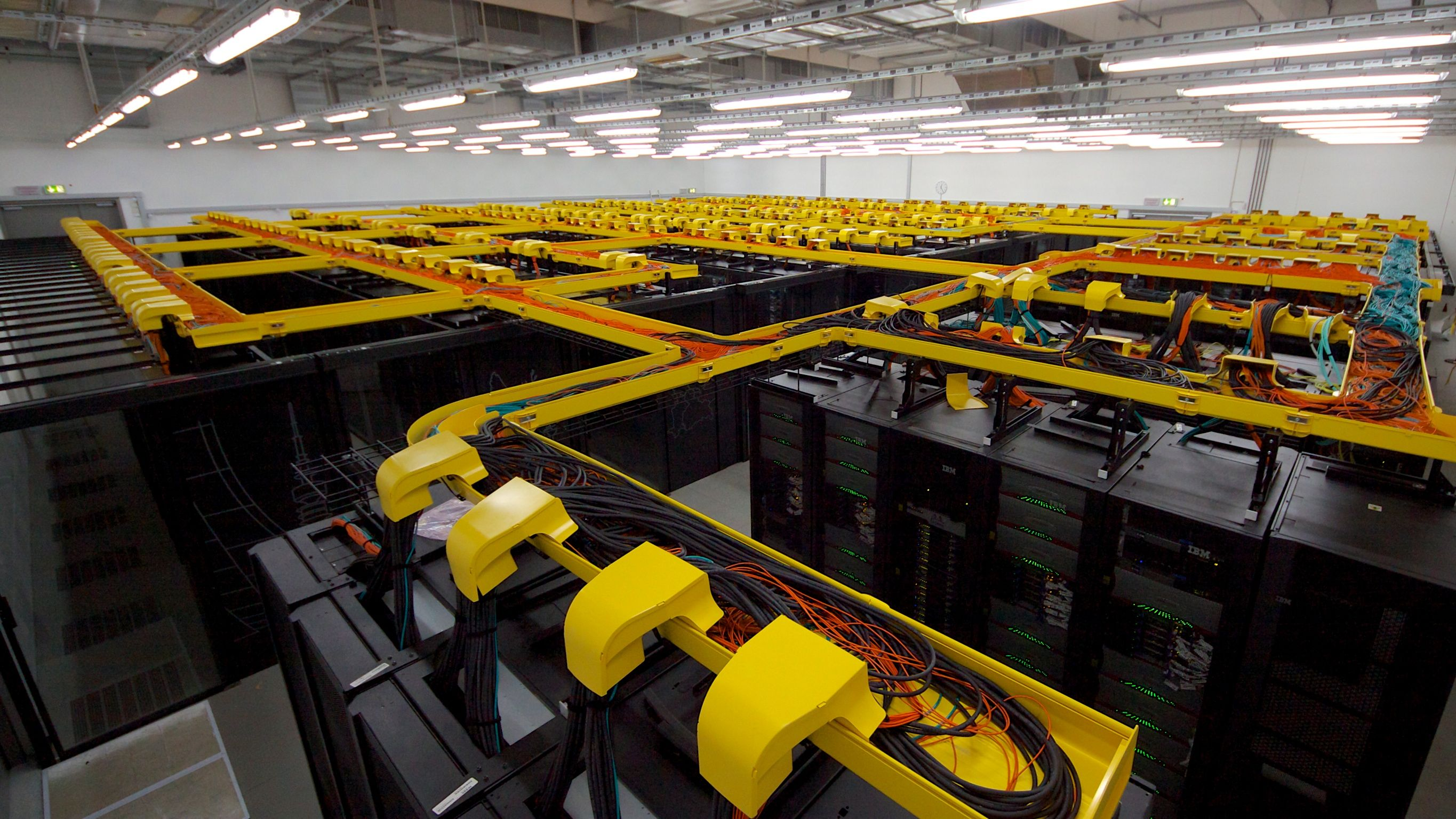
SuperMUC

SuperMUC (the suffix 'MUC' alludes to the IATA code of Munich's airport) is operated by the Leibniz Supercomputing Centre, a European centre for supercomputing. In order to house its hardware, the infrastructure space of the Leibniz Supercomputing Centre was more than doubled in 2012. SuperMUC was the fastest European supercomputer when it entered operation in the summer of 2012 and in 2015 was ranked No. 20 in the Top500 list of the world's fastest supercomputers. SuperMUC serves European researchers of many fields, including medicine, astrophysics, quantum chromodynamics, computational fluid dynamics, computational chemistry, life sciences, genome analysis and earth quake simulations.

== Performance ==
SuperMUC is an IBM iDataPlex system containing 19,252 Intel Xeon Sandy Bridge-EP and Westmere-EX multi-core processors (155,656 cores), for a peak performance of about 3 PFLOPS (3 × 10^{15} FLOPS). It has 340 TB of main memory and 15 PB of hard disk space. It uses a new form of cooling that IBM developed, called Aquasar, that uses hot water to cool the processors. IBM claims that this design saves 40 percent of the energy normally needed to cool a comparable system.

SuperMUC is connected to powerful visualization systems, which consist of a large 4K stereoscopic powerwall as well as a five-sided CAVE artificial virtual reality environment.

== SuperMUC-NG ==
SuperMUC-NG is the successor system operated by the Leibniz Supercomputing Centre (LRZ) in Garching, Germany, and has been deployed in two phases that complement each other. Phase 1, launched in 2019, consists of 6,480 CPU-only nodes based on Intel Xeon Platinum 8174 processors, providing more than 311,000 compute cores, around 720 TB of main memory and a peak performance of about 26.9 petaflops for large-scale simulations in fields such as astrophysics, climate research and fluid dynamics. Phase 2, installed from 2023 and in regular user operation since mid-2025, adds a separate GPU-accelerated cluster using Lenovo SD650-I V3 nodes with Intel Sapphire Rapids CPUs and Intel Data Center GPU Max accelerators, reaching roughly 28 petaflops peak and targeting AI-driven workloads and GPU-accelerated HPC applications while Phase 1 continues to serve primarily CPU-based simulations.
