= Leibniz Supercomputing Centre =

Supercomputing centre in Munich, Germany

Coordinates: 48°15′42″N 11°40′00″E

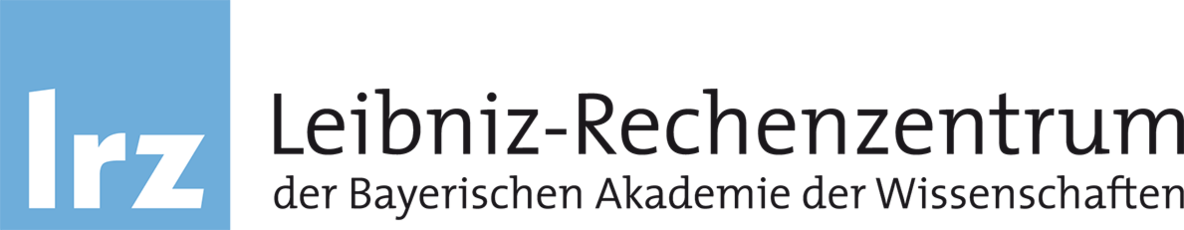
Logo

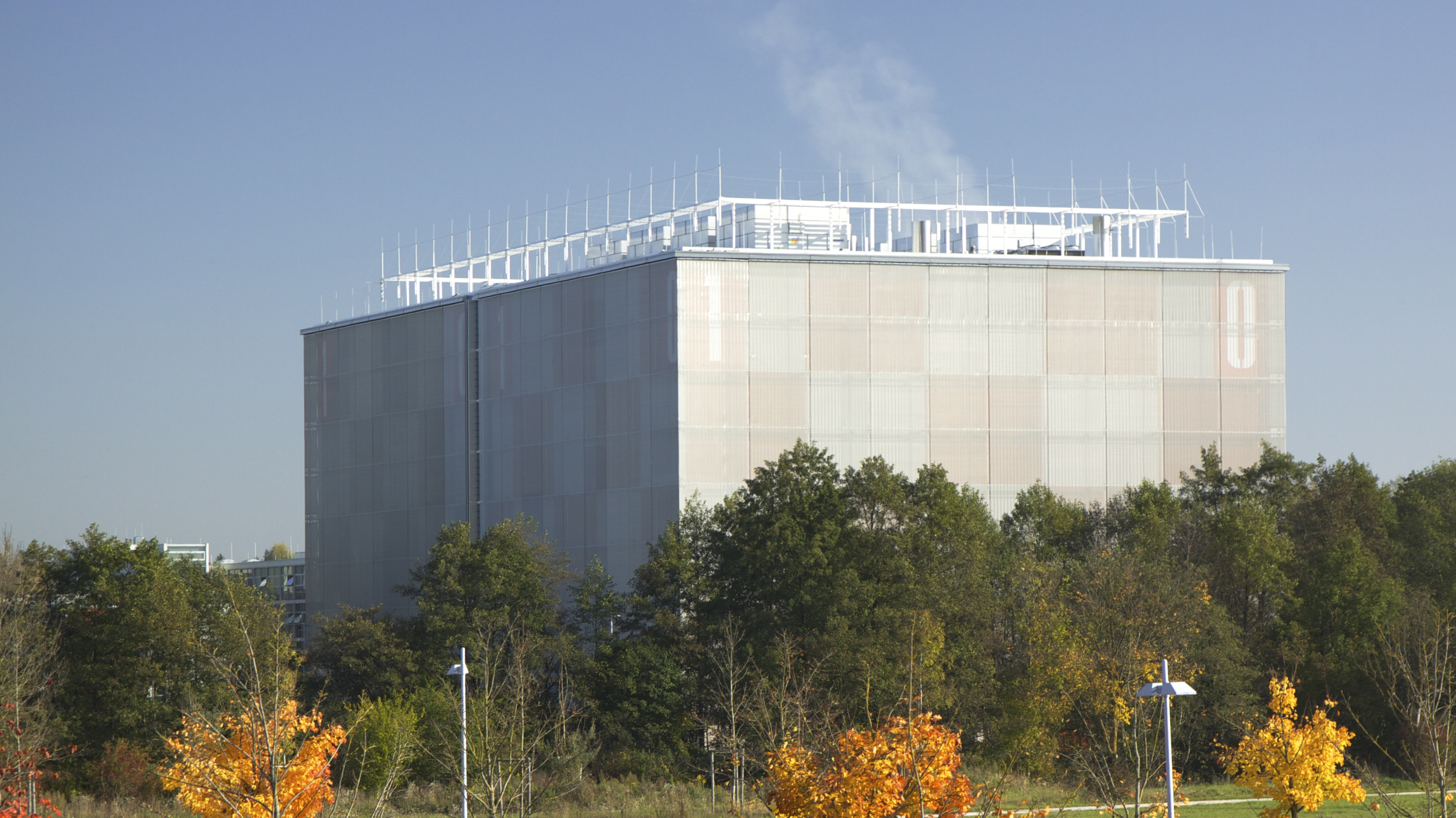
LRZ 'twin cube', home of the SuperMUC (October 2012)

The Leibniz Supercomputing Centre (LRZ) (German: Leibniz-Rechenzentrum) is a supercomputing centre on the Campus Garching near Munich, operated by the Bavarian Academy of Sciences and Humanities. Among other IT services, it provides supercomputer resources for research and access to the Munich Scientific Network (MWN); it is connected to the Deutsches Forschungsnetz with a 24 Gbit/s link. LRZ has also become one of the leaders in the research of interactions between high performance computing and quantum computing, with several quantum computers of differing modalities on site.

The centre is named after Gottfried Wilhelm Leibniz. It was founded in 1962 by Hans Piloty and Robert Sauer as part of the Bavarian Academy of Sciences and Humanities and the host for several world leading supercomputers (HLRB, HLRB-II, SuperMUC).

== SuperMUC ==
The Leibniz Supercomputing Centre operated SuperMUC, which was the fastest European supercomputer when it entered operation in 2012 and was ranked #9 in the TOP500 list of the world's fastest supercomputers. It has since been superseded by the more powerful SuperMUC-NG.
