= Eurotech (company) =

Italian IT company

Eurotech S.p.A.
- Type: Public (BIT: ETH)
- Industry: Computer hardware
- Founded: 1992
- Headquarters: Amaro, Udine, Italy
- Key people: Massimo Milan, CEO
- Products: Edge IoT gateways, edge servers, edge AI systems, edge data centers
- Number of employees: (317 as of December 31, 2025)
- Website: eurotech.com

Eurotech is a multinational company that designs and develops edge computing platforms and systems integrating hardware, software, AI, cybersecurity and services. Eurotech solutions enable intelligent data processing close to operational infrastructures, supporting applications in industrial, transportation and energy sectors, as well as other high-reliability environments. Eurotech works with leading technology partners worldwide, developing a global ecosystem for the delivery of integrated Edge AI and Internet of Things (IoT) projects and solutions.

== Description ==
Founded in 1992, Eurotech is a global company operating in multiple countries. It follows the technological paradigm of Pervasive Computing. The concept of pervasive or ubiquitous computing involves miniaturization and the distribution of intelligent devices throughout the environment, along with their ability to communicate. In this respect, NanoPCs and HPCs are the two major classes of devices that, by connecting to and cooperating, form a computing infrastructure labeled the pervasive GRID or pervasive computing grid.

== History ==
1998

Eurotech signed distribution agreements in the Americas, Asia, and Australia. Eurotech set up Neuricam S.p.A., a spin-off of the Trento institute for scientific and technological research.

1999

Eurotech started to cooperate with INFN (Italian Institute of Nuclear Physics) for the study and implementation of its third generation of Array Processor Experiment supercomputers, called APEmille. Eurotech's HPC business unit began with this cooperation.

2005

The company presented its apeNEXT supercomputer, realized in collaboration with INFN. A research centre on pervasive computing was activated at Nanjing University of Technology (NJUT) in China. The group created a Scientific Committee dedicated to identifying future trends. To finance its international growth, Eurotech went public on 30 November. The company is listed in the Star segment (high performance equities segment) of the Italian Stock Exchange (Borsa Italiana), raising 23.64 million Euros at IPO.

2006

Eurotech acquired Arcom Control Systems Ltd (based in Cambridge, England) and Arcom Control Systems Inc. (based in Kansas, US).

2008

The company presented Jan, the new generation of supercomputers born from an Italian-Spanish collaboration involving several universities and research institutes. Eurotech completed the merger of its United States-based subsidiaries, Arcom Control Systems Inc. and Applied Data Systems, into Eurotech Inc., which became the main US subsidiary. On 5 November, Finmeccanica acquired 11.1% of Eurotech.

2013

Eurotech scored both the first and second place of the Green 500, the ranking of the most energy efficient supercomputers in the world, with the Eurora supercomputer installed at CINECA and the Aurora Tigon supercomputer installed at the Finmeccanica company Selex ES, specialised in information technology and security. Eurora, the supercomputer of CINECA, entered in first place with 3210 MFlop/s per watt, while the system of Selex ES, Aurora Tigon, was ranked second with a value of 3180 MFlop/s per Watt. Eurotech has signed an agreement with Curtiss-Wright Controls, Inc., a segment of Curtiss-Wright Corporation, for the sale of 100% of the share capital of Parvus Corporation, the American fully owned subsidiary of the Eurotech Group, specializing in embedded computers and COTS subsystems for the US Defense market.

2014

Eurotech expanded its industrial computing portfolio with the introduction of the ReliaSENS 18-12, a cloud-connected environmental monitoring unit equipped with high-precision sensors designed for the real-time collection, processing, and analysis of air pollution metrics. During the same fiscal year, the company launched HiVe, a high-performance computing (HPC) product line based on a modular architecture designated as "Brick". Engineered to provide hardware flexibility and computing acceleration, the system implemented full liquid-cooling across all internal electronic components, optimizing thermal management and increasing computational density for enterprise-level deployments.

2015

The company expanded its commercial network within the Machine-to-Machine (M2M) and Internet of Things (IoT) sectors. This industrial integration focused on establishing complete, end-to-end data pipelines for corporate clients by linking field telemetry devices and intelligent edge gateways directly to Eurotech's proprietary software platform, Everyware Cloud (EC), enabling multi-sector hardware and software interoperability.

2016

Eurotech entered into a joint initiative with Red Hat within the Eclipse Foundation governance framework to develop an open-source IoT device management architecture. The collaboration co-sponsored the development of Eclipse Kapua, a project designed to manage the comprehensive lifecycle of IoT infrastructures, including remote application configurations and edge connectivity. Architected to interface with the existing Eclipse Kura project, Eclipse Kapua offered engineering communities a modular, community-driven framework as an alternative to proprietary end-to-end IoT software stacks. The initial open-source codebase for the platform was published in October 2016 to facilitate the scalable management of smart devices and IoT gateways.

2022

In September 2022, Eurotech acquired InoNet Computer GmbH, a German manufacturer of industrial PCs, for €10 million. The deal included a cash payment of €9.45 million and an earn-out of up to 300,000 shares based on targets through 2024. This acquisition aims to enhance Eurotech's presence in the DACH region (Germany, Austria, and Switzerland).

== See also ==
- List of Italian Companies
