= TGCC =

TGCC (Très Grand Centre de Calcul) is a new "green infrastructure" for high computing performance, able to host petascale supercomputers at French Alternative Energies and Atomic Energy Commission.

This supercomputing center has been planned to welcome the first French Petascale machine Curie, funded by GENCI for the PRACE Research Infrastructure, and the next generation of the CCRT Computing Center.
