= JUWELS =

Supercomputer in Germany

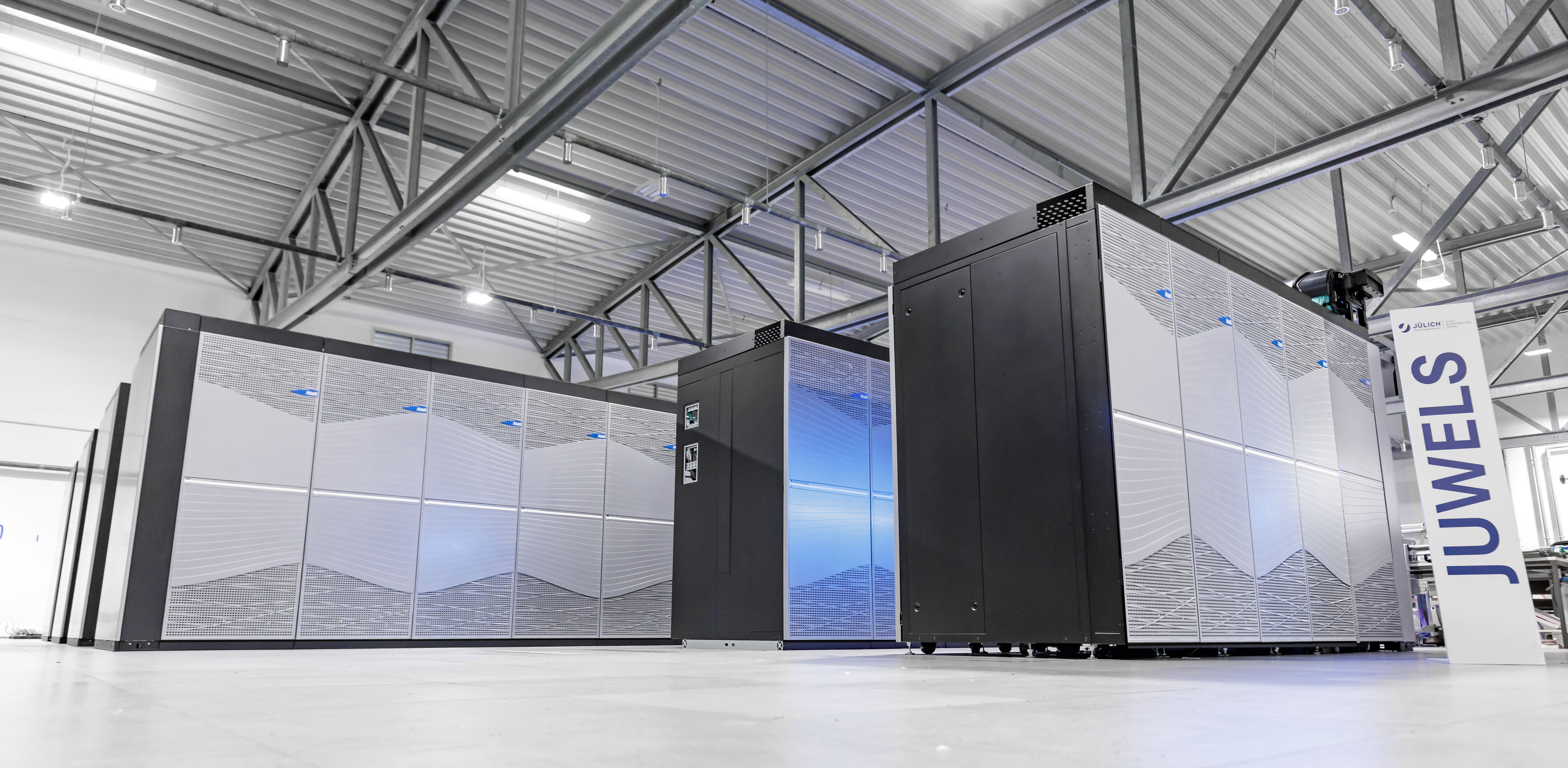
JUWELS supercomputer at Forschungszentrum Jülich

JUWELS (Jülich Wizard for European Leadership Science) is a supercomputer developed by Atos and hosted by the Jülich Supercomputing Centre (JSC) of the Forschungszentrum Jülich.

== Supercomputer ==
It is capable of a theoretical peak of 70.980 petaflops (the speed is for JUWELS Booster Module) and it serves as the replacement of the now out-of-operation JUQUEEN supercomputer. JUWELS Booster Module was ranked as the seventh fastest supercomputer in the world at its debut on the November 2020 TOP500 list. The JUWELS Booster Module is part of a modular system architecture and a second Xeon based JUWELS Cluster Module ranked separately as the 44th fastest supercomputer in the world on the November 2020 TOP500 list.

JUWELS Booster Module uses AMD Epyc processors with Nvidia A100 GPUs for acceleration. University of Edinburgh contracted a deal to utilise JUWELS to pursue research in the fields of particle physics, astronomy, cosmology and nuclear physics.

In 2021, JUWELS Booster was among eight other supercomputing systems which participated in the MLPerf HPC training benchmark, which is the benchmark developed by the consortium of artificial intelligence developers from academia, research labs, and industry aiming to unbiasedly evaluate the training and inference performance for hardware, software, and services used for AI. JUWELS also ranked among the top 15 on the worldwide Green500 list of energy-efficient supercomputers.

The Simulation and Data Laboratory (SimLab) for Climate Science at Forschungszentrum Jülich uses JUWELS to detect gravity waves in the atmosphere by running computing programs to continuously download and compute on the operational radiance measurements from the NASA's data servers.

== See also ==
- Computer science
- Computing
- Supercomputing in Europe
