= JUGENE =

Former supercomputer in Germany

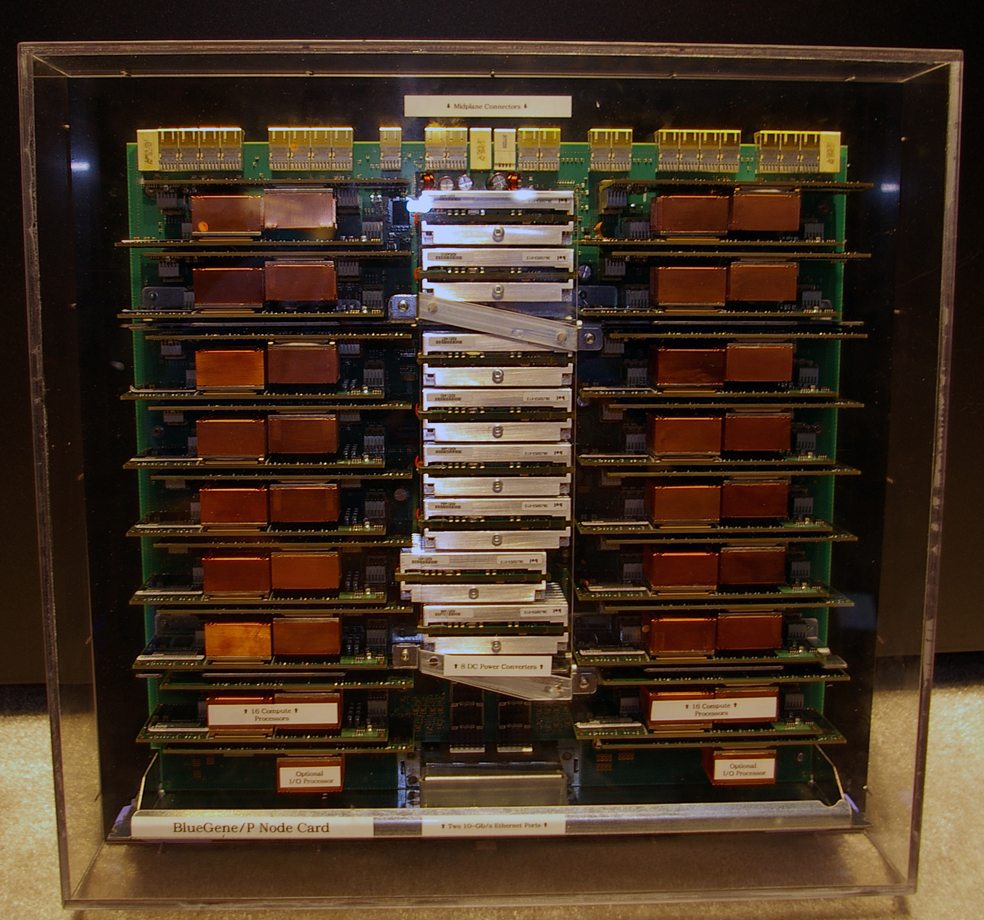
- A Blue Gene/P node card
- Sponsors: Forschungszentrum Jülich; North Rhine-Westphalia; Helmholtz Association of German Research Centres
- Operators: Forschungszentrum Jülich
- Architecture: 65,536 PowerPC 450
- Operating system: SUSE Linux Enterprise Server

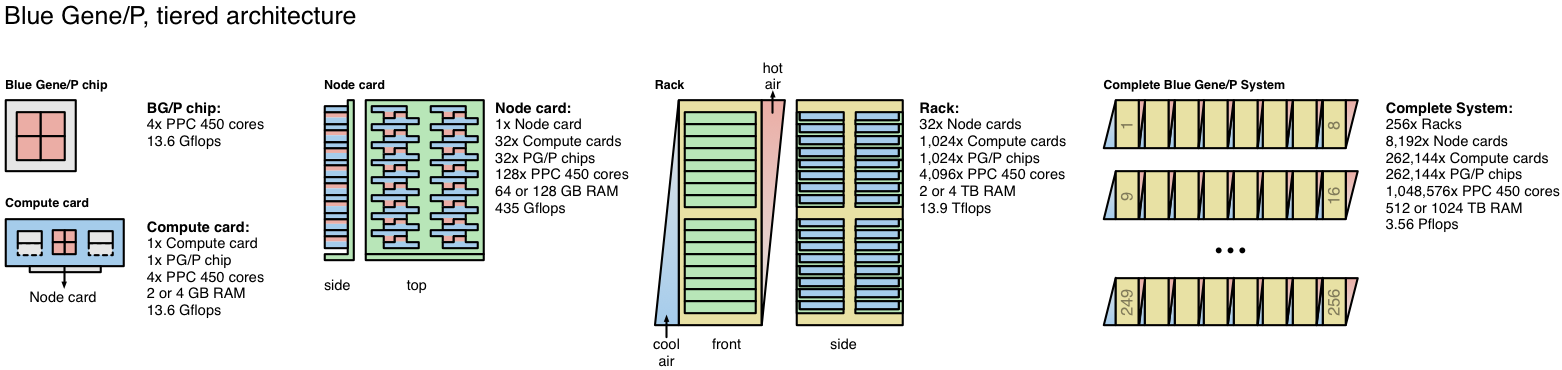
A schematic overview of a Blue Gene/P supercomputer

JUGENE (Jülich Blue Gene) was a supercomputer built by IBM for Forschungszentrum Jülich in Germany. It was based on the Blue Gene/P and succeeded the JUBL based on an earlier design. It was at the introduction the second fastest computer in the world, and the month before its decommissioning in July 2012 it was still at the 25th position in the TOP500 list. The computer was owned by the "Jülich Supercomputing Centre" (JSC) and the Gauss Centre for Supercomputing.

With 65,536 PowerPC 450 cores, clocked at 850 MHz and housed in 16 cabinets the computer reaches a peak processing power of 222.8 TFLOPS (R_{peak}). With an official Linpack rating of 167.3 TFLOPS (R_{max}) JUGENE took second place overall and is the fastest civil/commercially used computer in the TOP500 list of November 2007.

The computer was financed by Forschungszentrum Jülich, the State of North Rhine-Westphalia, the Federal Ministry for Research and Education as well as the Helmholtz Association of German Research Centres. The head of the JSC, Thomas Lippert, said that "The unique thing about our JUGENE is its extremely low power consumption compared to other systems even at maximum computing power". A Blue Gene/P-System should reach about 0.35 GFLOPS/Watt and is therefore an order of magnitude more effective than a common x86 based supercomputer for a similar task.

In February 2009 it was announced that JUGENE would be upgraded to reach petaflops performance in June 2009, making it the first petascale supercomputer in Europe.

On May 26, 2009, the newly configured JUGENE was unveiled. It includes 294,912 processor cores, 144 terabyte memory, 6 petabyte storage in 72 racks. With a peak performance of about one PetaFLOPS, it was at the time the third fastest supercomputer in the world, ranking behind IBM Roadrunner and Jaguar. The new configuration also incorporates a new water cooling system that will reduce the cooling cost substantially.

The two front nodes of JUGENE are operated with SUSE Linux Enterprise Server 10.

JUGENE was decommissioned on 31 July 2012 and replaced by the Blue Gene/Q system JUQUEEN.
