= Arctur-1 =

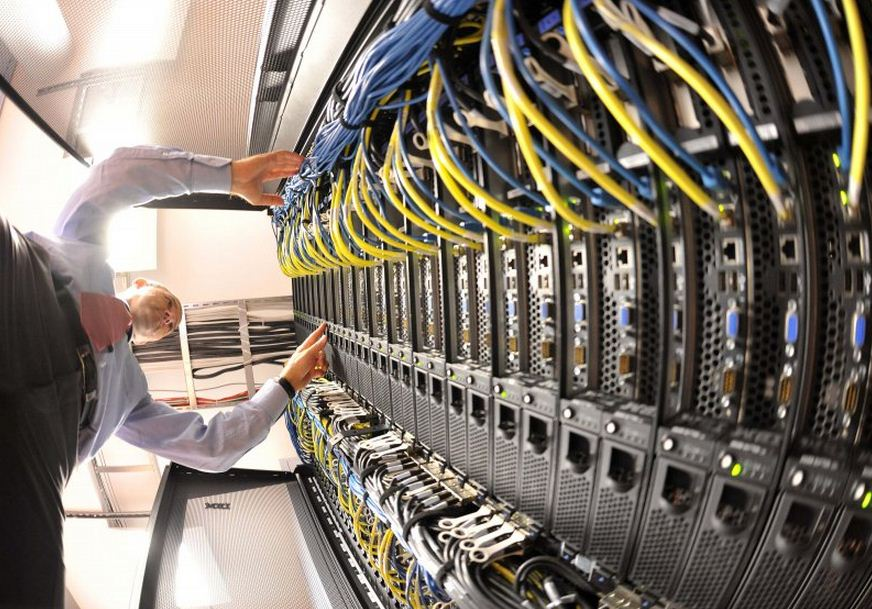
Arctur-1 HPC

Arctur-1 was a supercomputer located in Slovenia which is used by scientific and technical users in technologically intensive industries and research. In 2017 it was replaced by Arctur-2.

The High Performance Computer (HPC) was located in Gorjansko (Slovenia) and was put into operation in October 2010. Arctur-1 was built with 84 IBM iDataPlex dx360 M3 nodes, each with two Intel Xeon X5650 cores (6 cores clocked at 2,66 GHz) for a total of 1008 cores, 2,66 terabytes of memory (2,66 gigabytes per core), reaching a peak processing power of 10 TFlops (Rpeak). Compute nodes are connected with InfiniBand QDR 40 Gbit/s. The supercomputer was managed by Arctur.
