= Stallo (disambiguation) =

A stallo is a large human-like creature in the folklore of the Sami.

Stallo may also refer to:

- Stallo (computer), a supercomputer at the University of Tromsø, Norway
- Stallo, Mississippi, an unincorporated community in Neshoba County, Mississippi
- John Stallo (1823–1900), a German-American academic
