= National Computer Center for Higher Education (France) =

French research center

Coordinates: 43°38′07″N 3°50′29″E

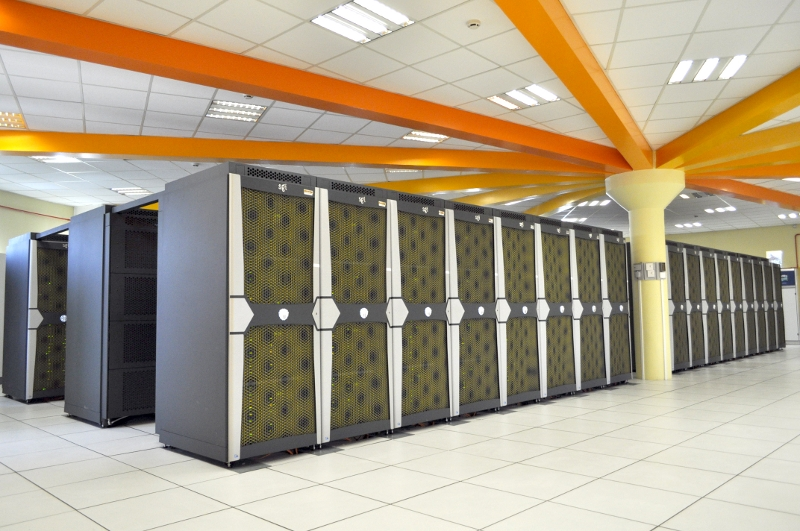
The Jade SGI Altix supercomputer at CINES

The National Computer Center for Higher Education (CINES), based in Montpellier, is a public institution under the supervision of the Ministry of Higher Education and Research (MESR) created by a decree issued in 1999. CINES offers IT services for public research in France. It is one of the major national centers for computing power supply for research in France.

CINES has three missions:

- High performance computation on super-computers;
- Permanent archiving of electronic documents; and,
- Hosting of national computer equipment.

== History ==
The National University Center for Computation (CNUSC) in Montpellier was established in 1981, responsible for hosting scientific apps for the research community, as well as applications in the field of librarianship. At the end of December 1999, the CNUSC was transformed into the current CINES, created by Decree N. 99-318 of 20 April 1999. The change brought new missions and a change of status. On the sixth march of 2014, the status of CINES was further amended by decree, published in the official journal. This decree provides a new mission which is the hosting of computer equipment on a national level. During this period, the number of employees within the institution stood around forty technicians and engineers.

== Calculating mission ==
The CINES (National Center for Scientific Research) has been providing computing resources to the French research community for a considerable period of time. The center regularly updates its machine fleet to keep up with technological advancements. To facilitate its operations, CINES collaborates with the National Large Intensive Computing Equipment (GENCI).

In June 2018, the Oxygen supercomputer, owned by CINES, was ranked 70th in the TOP500 list of the world's most powerful computers. The Occident machine, also known as BullX, is another computing resource available at CINES. It has a peak processing power of 3.5 petaflops and is composed of a total of 3,366 nodes. These nodes consist of 85,824 calculation cores, which are further divided into different configurations.

The Occident machine comprises 2,106 dual-socket nodes equipped with Intel Xeon E5-2690V3 Haswell processors. Each node contains 12 cores. Additionally, there are 1,260 dual-socket nodes equipped with Intel Xeon E5-2690V4 Broadwell processors, each having 14 cores. The machine utilizes InfiniBand FDR 4x technology, which enables high-speed data communication at 56 GBits per second. In terms of storage, the Occident machine has a capacity of 5 petabytes (Po) of disks, utilizing the Luster file system.

In January 2011, CINES had several machines for high performance computing:

- an SGI Altix ICE 8200 EX7 machine;
- an IBM P1600 + Cluster POWER5 machine;
- a Bull cluster (with GPU for hybrid computing).
- The supercomputer Jade CINES: The Jade supercomputer (SGI Altix ICE 8200 EX) with a power of 267 Tflops
- 1,536 dual-socket nodes equipped with Intel Xeon E5472 processors with 32 GB of RAM
- 1,344 dual-socket nodes equipped with Intel Nehalem X5560 processors with 36 GB of RAM
- Infiniband DDR and QDR 4x dual plane
- 700 TB of disks (Luster)
- The IBM machine with a power of 1.85 + 0.6 TFlops
- 9 Power4 nodes with 32/64 GB of RAM
- switch Federation
- 4TB of Disks (GPFS)
- 5 nodes P575 to 32 GB
- Infiniband

The Jade supercomputer was ranked 27th in the world of TOP 500 calculators in November 2010, it was the sixth European machine and the first French machine for public research.

== Top500 ranking ==
Every six months, the world TOP500 supercomputer ranking is held. the table below shows the best places won by the various Cines systems.

Date	System number	Best ranking	Processor number	TéraFLOPS/s	TéraFLOPS/s	TOP500 link
1995-06	1	140	32	0.005800	0.008512	http://www.top500.org/system/169569 [archive]
1996-06	1	77	79	0.015060	0.021014	http://www.top500.org/system/169672 [archive]
1997-11	1	112	79	0.02730	0.03792	http://www.top500.org/system/169775 [archive]
1998-06	1	137	107	0.03655	0.05136	http://www.top500.org/system/169718 [archive]
1998-11	1	121	127	0.04310	0.06096	http://www.top500.org/system/169720 [archive]
1999-06	1	95	207	0.06780	0.09936	http://www.top500.org/system/169729 [archive]
1999-11	3	98	256+112+207=575	0.24020	0.35236	http://www.top500.org/site/311 [archive]
2000-11	4	132	224+256+207+96=783	0.3714	0.52866	http://www.top500.org/site/311 [archive]
2001-06	4	44	472+160+256+207=1095	0.814	1.12096	http://www.top500.org/site/311 [archive]
2001-11	3	56	472+320+256=1048	0.874	1.1816	http://www.top500.org/site/311 [archive]
2002-06	2	90	472+320=792	0.753	1.028	http://www.top500.org/site/311 [archive]
2002-11	3	90	472+512+256=1240	0.753	1.028	http://www.top500.org/site/311 [archive]
2003-06	2	192	472+512=984	0.989	1.22	http://www.top500.org/site/311 [archive]
2008-11	1	14	12288	128.4	146.74	http://www.top500.org/system/9830 [archive]
2010-06	1	18	12288+10752=23040	237.8	267.88	http://www.top500.org/system/10558 [archive]
2014-11	1	26	50544	1628.8	2102.63	http://www.top500.org/system/178465 [archive]
2017-06	1	50	85824	2494.7	3570.30	https://www.top500.org/system/179092 [archive]
2017-11	1	54	85824	2494.7	3570.30	https://www.top500.org/system/179092 [archive]
2018-06	1	70	85824	2494.7	3570.30	https://www.top500.org/system/179092 [archive]
2021-11	1	234	85824	2494.7	3570.30	https://www.top500.org/system/179092 [archive]
2022-06	2	10	319072	46100	61607.9	https://www.top500.org/system/180051/
2024-06	2	20	319072	46100	61607.9	https://www.top500.org/system/180051/

== Permanent archiving mission ==
Archiving digital data is a key factor in the success of any digitization and information-sharing policy. The second national strategic mission assigned to CINES is the development and implementation of a powerful solution for long-term preservation of the digital heritage. In addition to exceptional resources and equipment in the field of supercomputing, CINES has access to one of the largest French production platforms dedicated to archiving digital data. The documents that are candidates for long-term archiving in PAC are scientific data from observations, measurements, simulations or calculations; heritage data such as the theses defended in France, pedagogical data, publications (articles published in particular on the HAL platform) or collections of digitized scientific journals; and administrative data from universities.

To respond to some issues raised in the context of sustainable digital archiving, which are inevitable risks for which procedures must be put in place to mitigate their impact on the day they occur, CINES relies on the use of national and international standards as well as a quality approach using proactive management risks and an approach for the certification of the service.

CINES has an expertise cell on data formats, which also includes a computer and archival experience that allows it to be a strong leader in sustainable digital archiving in Europe.

== Hosting computer equipment mission ==
The new mission of CINES is to provide support for the research community that needs space to help important computing environments operate. The goal is to provide organizations lacking material space in the machine room with the possibility of increasing their capacity in the number of racks. It is often difficult to store multiple racks with all the dependent components (energy, air conditioning, 24/24 maintenance). CINES can bring this technical environment because its environment is adapted to accommodate computing in "industrial quantity".

== See also ==
- Supercomputing in Europe
- Research and Technology Computing Center (France)
