= Gauss Centre for Supercomputing =

German research institute

The Gauss Centre for Supercomputing (GCS) coordinates Germany's three national Tier-0 supercomputing facilities: the HLRS in Stuttgart, the JSC at Forschungszentrum Jülich, and the LRZ in Garching near Munich. Together, the member institutions provide high-performance computing infrastructure and technical training for academic, scientific, and industrial research in Germany and across Europe.

GCS is the German member of PRACE (Partnership for Advance Computing in Europe), an international non-profit association consisting of 25 member countries, whose representative organizations create a pan-European supercomputing infrastructure, providing access to computing and data management resources and services for large-scale scientific and engineering applications at the highest performance level.

GCS is jointly funded by the Federal Ministry of Education and Research and the federal states of Baden-Württemberg, Bavaria and North Rhine-Westphalia.

GCS has its headquarters in Berlin, Germany.

== See also ==
- TOP500
- Supercomputing in Europe
- eScience
