= Research and Technology Computing Center (France) =

The Research and Technology Computing Center (Centre de calcul recherche et technologie, CCRT) is a supercomputing center in Île-de-France.

The center started operation in 2003 and is part of the CEA scientific computing complex in Bruyères-le-Châtel. It operates the Tera 100 machine, as of July 2011 the fastest supercomputer in Europe with a peak of 1.25 petaFLOPs.

== See also ==
- TOP500
- National Computer Center for Higher Education (France)
- Supercomputing in Europe
