= JUQUEEN =

Supercomputer in Germany

- Active: 2012 – May 2018
- Sponsors: Helmholtz Association, Gauss Centre for Supercomputing
- Location: Forschungszentrum Jülich
- Speed: 5.9 petaflops
- Ranking: TOP500: 5th
- Purpose: Scientific research

JUQUEEN was a Blue Gene/Q system supercomputer built by IBM. Financed by the Helmholtz Association and the Gauss Centre for Supercomputing (GCS) in equal parts from federal funds and state funds from North Rhine-Westphalia, it was put into operation in 2012 at the Forschungszentrum Jülich as the successor to the JUGENE supercomputer.

JUQUEEN was the fastest computer in Europe and ranked 5th on the TOP500 list of the most powerful supercomputers. It was also one of the most energy-efficient systems in the world for its time and ranked 5th on the Green500 list. It consisted of 458,752 processor cores and had a maximum computing power of 5.9 petaflops.

JUQUEEN was used for several research projects, including the Human Brain Project.

JUQEEN was shut down in May 2018 after six years of operation and replaced by the successor JUWELS.
