= Tera-10 =

TERA-10 is a supercomputer built by Bull SA for the French Commissariat à l'Énergie Atomique, (Atomic Energy Commission).

TERA-10 was ranked 142nd on the TOP500 list in 2010. By 2015 it had dropped off the bottom of the list. During its operational period, it ran at 52.84 teraFLOPs (52.84 trillion floating-point calculations per second) using nearly 10,000 processor cores (in about 4800 dual-core processors). It runs the Linux operating system, with an SMP kernel specially modified to handle very large symmetric clusters (it was cadenced by an 8-processors central system during its main use phase).

Its main application is the simulation of atomic experiences and the maintenance of the French nuclear defence force, using the results of true nuclear tests (between 1956 and 1995, most of them in the French Nuclear Test Plant in the Pacific) and the new results obtained from the LMJ (Laser Mega-Joule) built in continental France.

== Evolution ==
Evolution TERA-10 represented the end of its generation's evolution. It was succeeded by the next generation, Tera-100, which reached about 1 petaFLOPS. The Tera-100 utilizes processors with more internal cores and a new central scheduling system, which allows asymmetric operation on a variable number of processors. This design was implemented for easier upgrades, lower maintenance cost, and more experiences requiring different computing scales, without having to rebuild the whole cluster.
