= Astrid Lambrecht =

German physicist

- Born: January 20, 1967 (age 59)
- Education: University of Duisburg-Essen; Imperial College London; Kastler–Brossel Laboratory
- Scientific career
- Workplaces: Kastler–Brossel Laboratory; Max Planck Institute of Quantum Optics; Pierre and Marie Curie University; French National Centre for Scientific Research; Forschungszentrum Jülich
- Thesis: Atomes froids et fluctuations quantiques (1995)

Astrid Lambrecht (born 20 January 1967) is a German physicist who is Director at Forschungszentrum Jülich. She previously worked as the Deputy Director of the French National Centre for Scientific Research Institute of Physics.

== Early life and education ==
Lambrecht was born in Mülheim. She completed her undergraduate studies in physics at the University of Duisburg-Essen and Imperial College London. At Imperial College, she worked alongside Peter Knight. She moved to Paris for her doctoral research, studying quantum fluctuations of cold atoms at the Kastler–Brossel Laboratory. Based in the laboratory of Elisabeth Giacobino, she used an optical cavity and magneto-optic trap to study quantum noise. She was a postdoctoral researcher at the Max Planck Institute of Quantum Optics. Lambrecht completed her habilitation at the Pierre and Marie Curie University.

== Research and career ==
Lambrecht was appointed to the Institute of Physics at research leader at the French National Centre for Scientific Research, where she studied quantum fluctuations in cold matter. In particular, she worked on the Casimir effect. The Casimir effect is exploited in microelectromechanical systems. At the same time, Lambrecht demonstrated that the Casimir effect has fundamental impacts in biology and chemistry. In 2014, she was made deputy director of the Kastler–Brossel Laboratory, and in 2016, Deputy Scientific Director at the CNRS headquarters. She was nominated Director of the Institute of Physics in 2018. In 2021, Lambrecht joined the Board of Directors at the Forschungszentrum Jülich.

== Awards and honours ==
- 2005 Société Française de Physique Aimé Cotton Award
- 2013 CNRS silver medal
- 2016 Gentner-Kastler-Prize
- 2019 French Legion of Honour

== Selected publications ==
- A. Lambrecht; S. Reynaud (1 February 2000). "Casimir force between metallic mirrors". European Physical Journal D. 8 (3): 309–318. arXiv:quant-ph/9907105. doi:10.1007/s100530050041. ISSN 1434-6060. Wikidata Q60500091.
- Astrid Lambrecht; Jaekel MT; Reynaud S (1 July 1996). "Motion Induced Radiation from a Vibrating Cavity". Physical Review Letters. 77 (4): 615–618. arXiv:quant-ph/9606029. doi:10.1103/physrevlett.77.615. ISSN 0031-9007. PMID 10062859. Wikidata Q60500102.
- Astrid Lambrecht; Paulo A Maia Neto; Serge Reynaud (20 October 2006). "The Casimir effect within scattering theory". New Journal of Physics. 8 (10): 243–243. arXiv:quant-ph/0611103. Bibcode:2006NJPh....8..243L. doi:10.1088/1367-2630/8/10/243. ISSN 1367-2630. Wikidata Q60500059.
