= Gorjansko =

Gorjansko Goriano
- Village
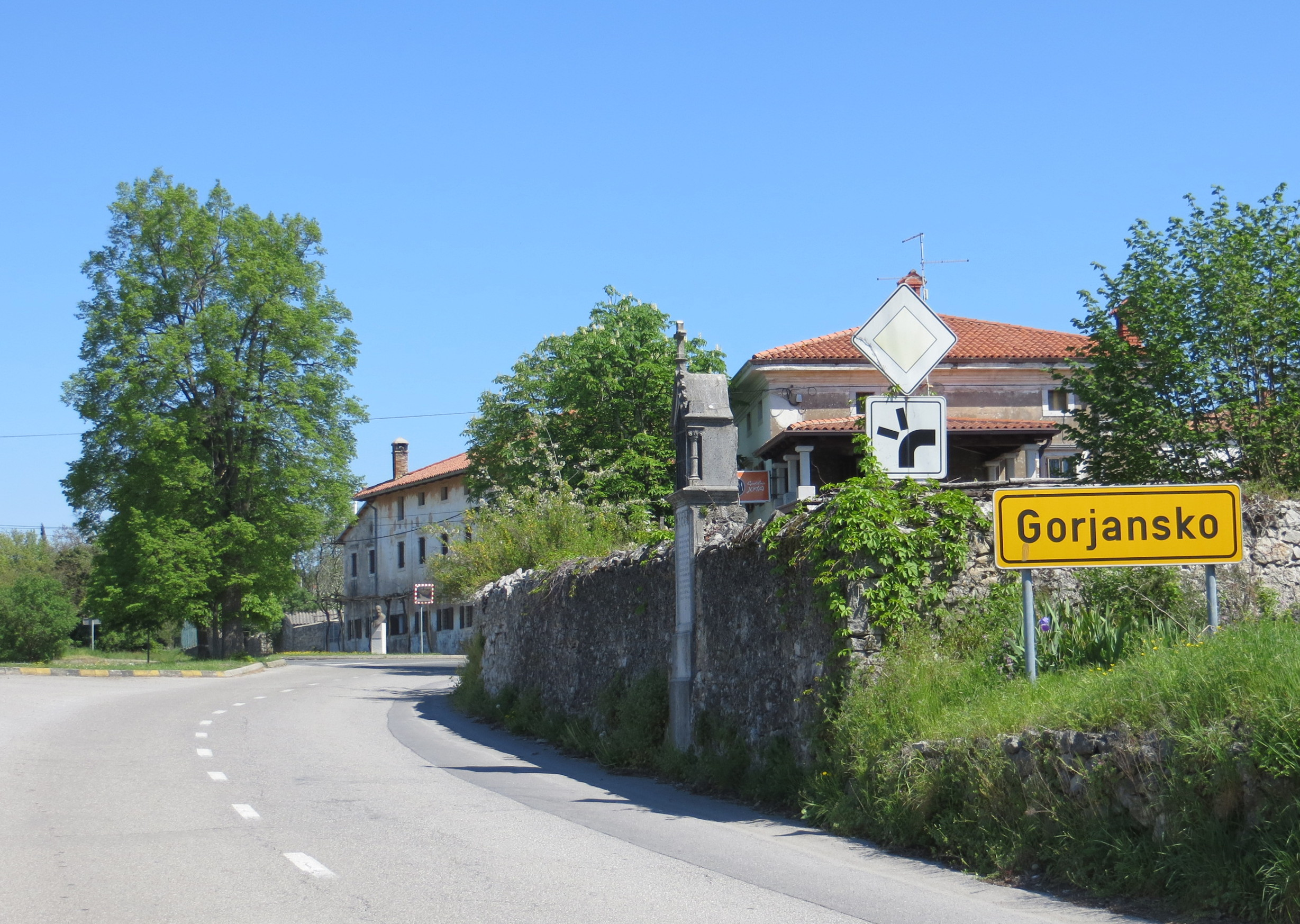

- Location in Slovenia
- Coordinates: 45°48′4.47″N 13°42′59.28″E
- Country: Slovenia
- Traditional region: Slovene Littoral
- Statistical region: Coastal–Karst
- Municipality: Komen

Area
  - Total: 10.41 km^{2} (4.02 sq mi)
- Elevation: 198 m (650 ft)

Population (2002)
  - Total: 271

Gorjansko (pronounced [ɡɔˈɾjaːnskɔ], Italian: Goriano) is a village in the southwestern part of the Municipality of Komen in the Littoral region of Slovenia on the border with Italy.

The parish church in the settlement is dedicated to Saint Andrew and belongs to the Diocese of Koper. It was built in 1896 on top of the ruins of a smaller Gothic church and was renovated in the late 1950s, when its interior was painted by Tone Kralj. Close to the settlement is also a large cemetery of over 10,000 Austro-Hungarian soldiers of various nationalities that died on the Isonzo front in the First World War. It is the largest such cemetery in Slovenia.

== Gallery ==
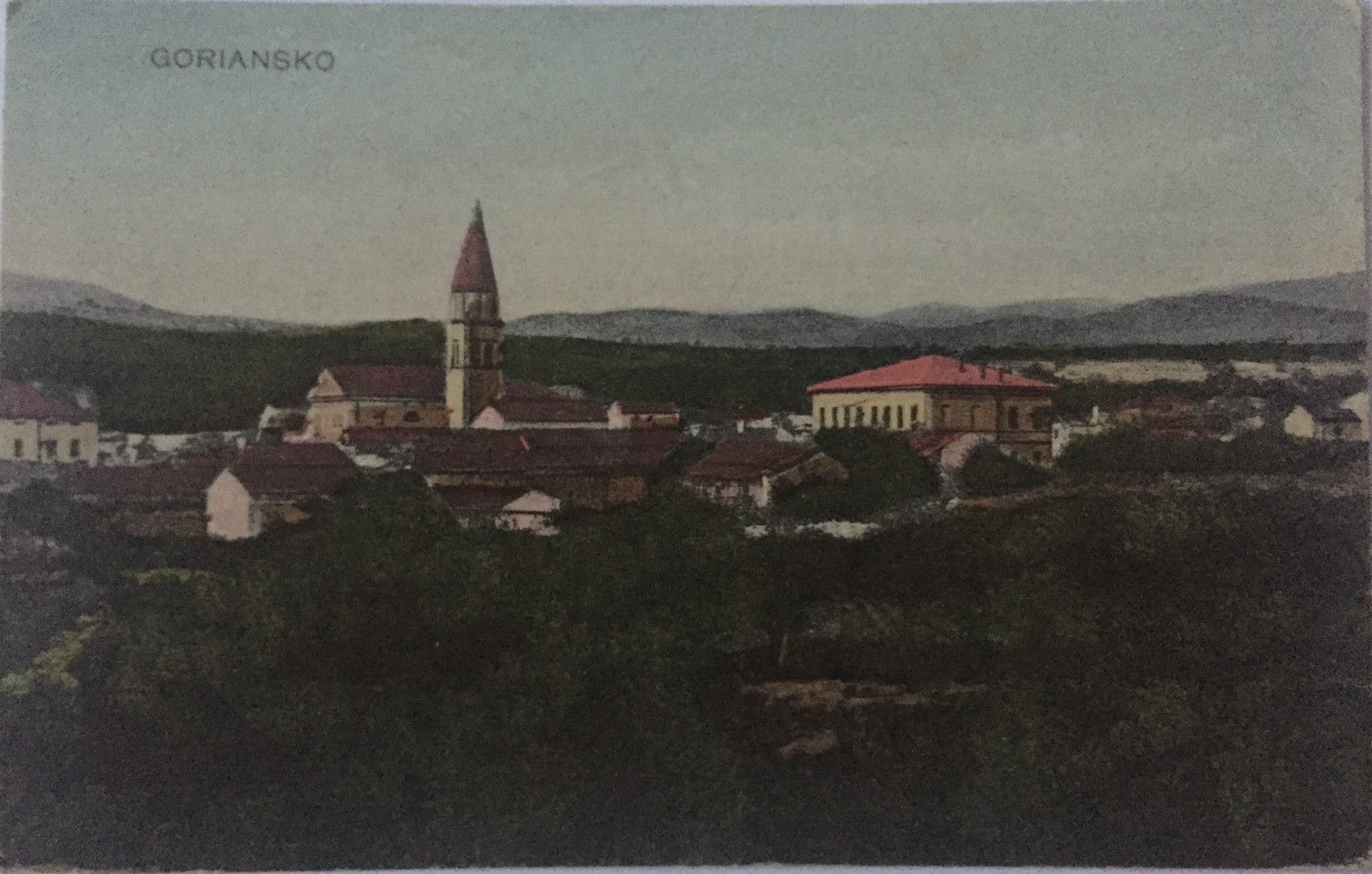
1913 postcard of Gorjansko
