= GENCI =

The Grand équipement national de calcul intensif (GENCI) is a société civile owned for 49% by the French State represented by the Ministry of Higher Education and Research, for 20% by Commissariat à l'énergie atomique, 20% by French National Centre for Scientific Research, 10% by the Universities and 1% by National Institute for Research in Computer Science and Control. Its purpose is to implement and ensure the coordination of the major equipments of the French high-performance computing centres by providing funding and by assuming ownership.

GENCI coordinates the allocation of compute time for the three national computing centers CINES, IDRIS, and TGCC-CEA.
