= High Performance Computing Center, Stuttgart =

Supercomputer research institute in Stuttgart, Germany

Coordinates: 48°44′22″N 9°05′50″E

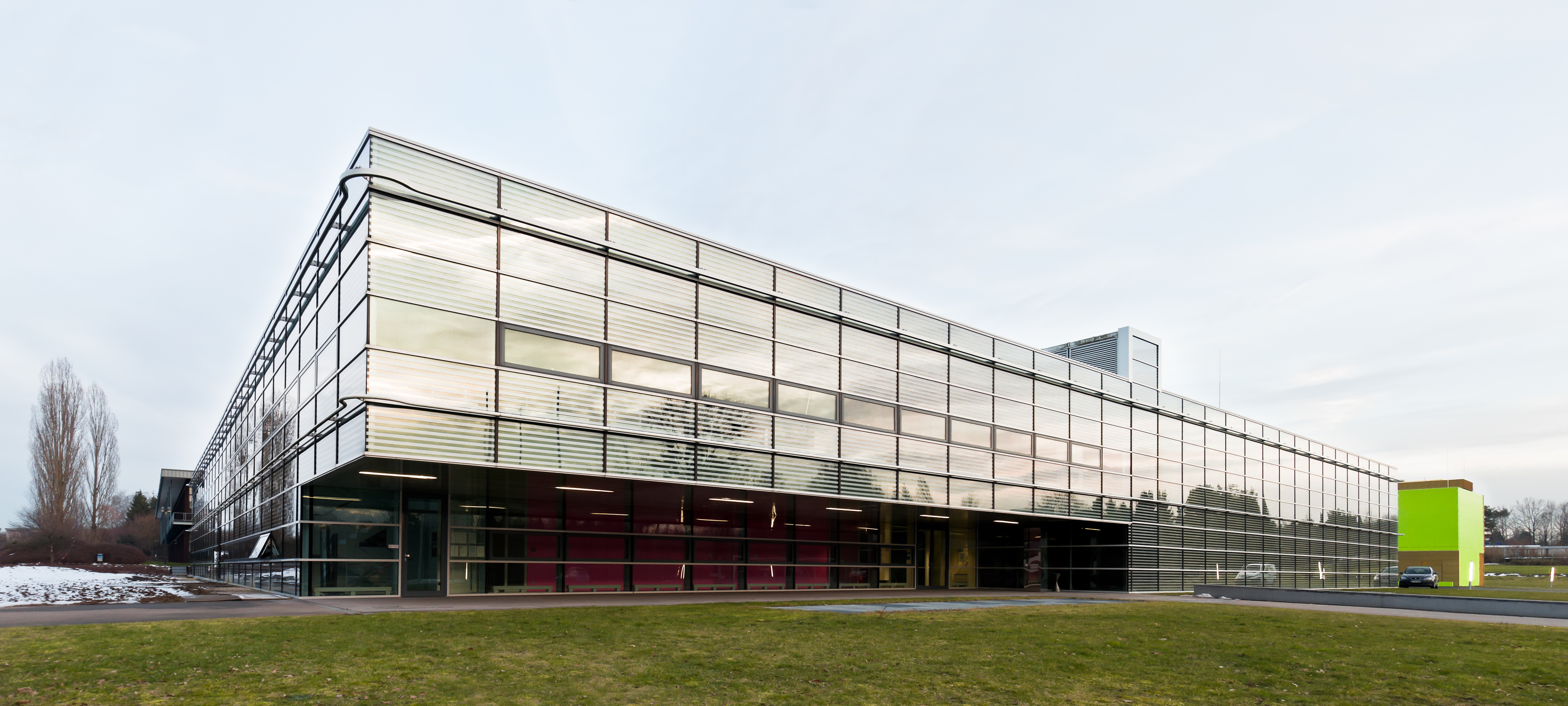
Building in Stuttgart

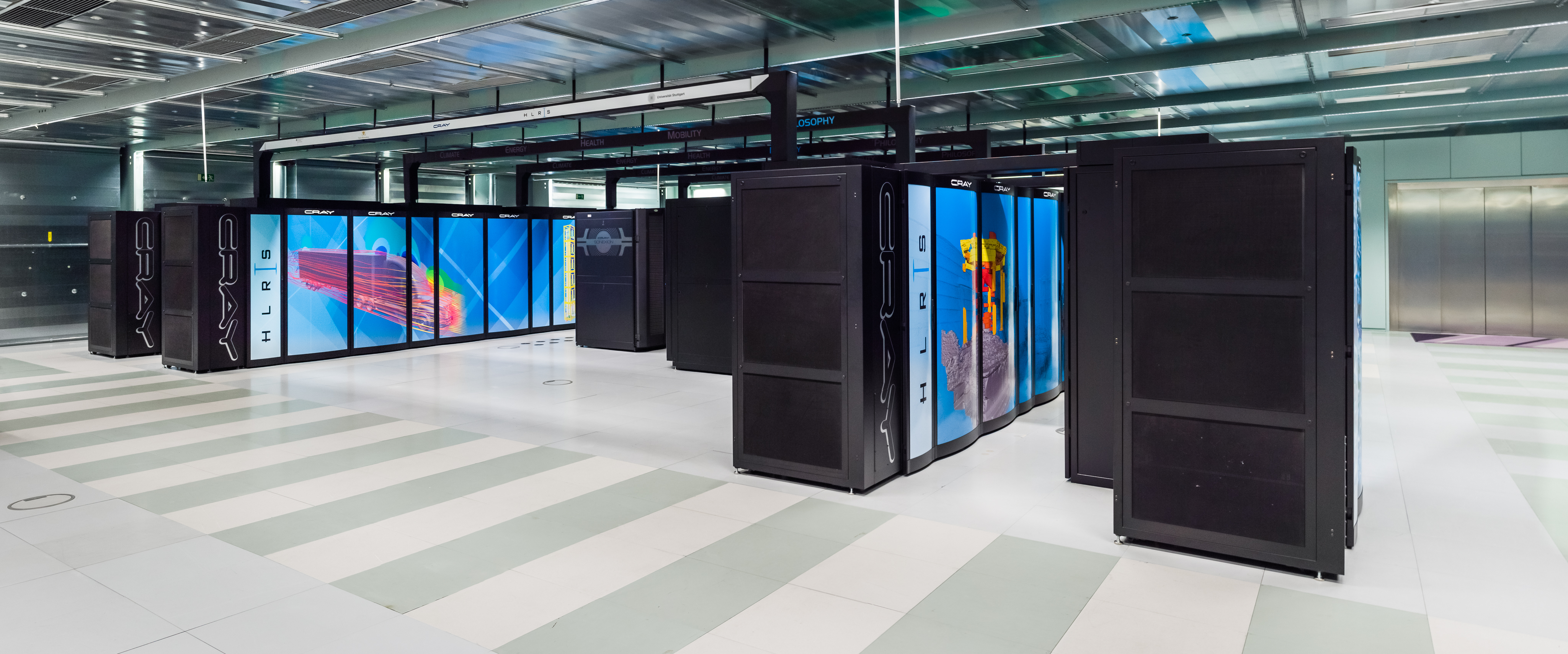
Cray XC40 "Hazel Hen"

The High Performance Computing Center (HLRS) in Stuttgart, Germany, is a research institute and a supercomputer center. HLRS has currently a flagship installation of a HPE Apollo 9000 system called Hawk 26 PFLOPS peak performance replacing the Cray XC40 system called Hazel Hen, providing ~7,4 PFLOPS peak performance. Additional systems include NEC clusters (NEC SX-ACE systems for testing, NEC Vulcan + Vulcan2 for non-critical computing) and Cray CS-Storm cluster.

Known historical configurations:

1996 - Cray T3E / 512 + NEC SX-4

2000 - Hitachi SR-8000 + NEC SX-5 / 32M2

2003 - ? (Opteron/Xeon cluster) + NEC SX-6

2005 - NEC SX-8

2008 - IBM BW-Grid + NEC SX-9

2009 - Cray XT5M

2010 - Cray XE6 "Hermit"

2014 - Cray XC40 "Hornet"

2019 - Cray CS-Storm

2020 - HPE Apollo 9000 "Hawk" + NEC (Vulcan + Vulcan2 + NEC SX-ACE).

== See also ==
- TOP500
- Supercomputing in Europe
