= Arctur-2 =

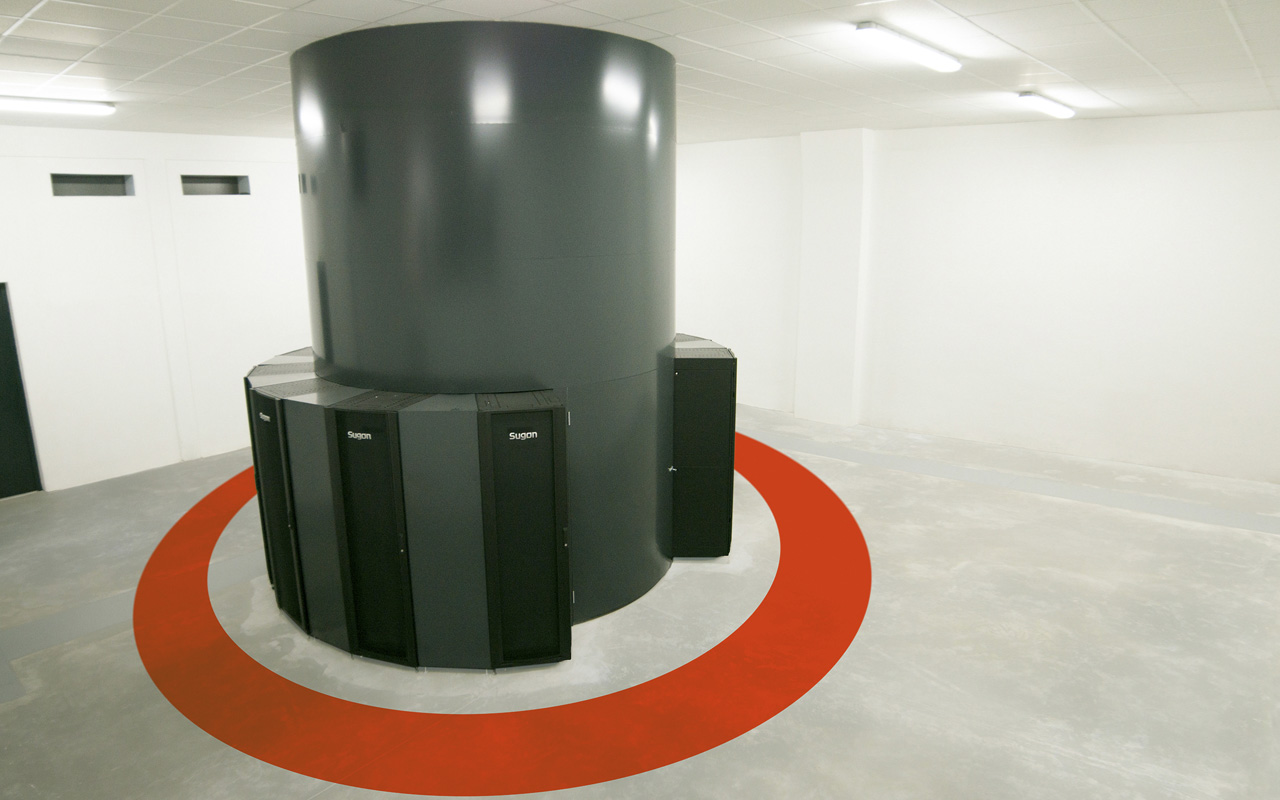
Arctur-2 supercomputer

Arctur-2 is a supercomputer located in Slovenia which is used by scientists and industry professionals to run intensive workloads and computer simulations such as aerodynamics simulations and steel casting simulations. It is managed by Arctur.

The Arctur-2 High Performance Computer (HPC) is located in Nova Gorica (Slovenia) and was put into operation in early 2017. Arctur-2 is a system built by Sugon and consists of 30 nodes, each with two Intel Xeon E5-2690v4 processors; 8 of these nodes are equipped with 4 Nvidia Tesla M60 GPUs each, and another 8 of them have big memory capacity of 1024GB per node.
