= Tera 100 =

Supercomputer

Design
- Manufacturer: Bull SA
- Release date: May 26, 2010
- Units sold: 1

System
- Front-end: Bullx Series S servers ('Mesca')
- Operating system: Bull XBAS Linux (Red Hat Enterprise Linux derivative)
- CPU: 140,000 Intel Xeon 7500 processor cores
- Memory: 300 TB
- Storage: 20 PB
- FLOPS: 1 PetaFLOPS (sustained), 1.25 PetaFLOPS (peak)

Tera 100 is a supercomputer built by Bull SA for the French Commissariat à l'Énergie Atomique.

On May 26, 2010, Tera 100 was turned on. The computer, which is located in Essonne is able to sustain around 1 petaFLOPs maximum performance and a peak at 1.25 petaFLOPs. It has 4300 Bullx Series S servers ('Mesca'), 140,000 Intel Xeon 7500 processor cores, and 300 TB of memory. The Interconnect is QDR InfiniBand. The file system has a throughput of 500 GB/s and total storage of 20 PB. It uses the SLURM resource manager for scheduling batch jobs.

Tera 100 uses Bull XBAS Linux, a partly Red Hat Enterprise Linux derivative.

In June 2011, TOP500 deemed it the ninth fastest supercomputer in the world, and in 2020, it had dropped off the list.

== See also ==
- Computer science
- Computing
- Tera-10
