= Stallo (computer) =

Stallo is a supercomputer at the University of Tromsø. It was put into use on the 10 December 2007, then as the world 87th most powerful supercomputer, and reached, in June 2008, a peak of 62nd in the TOP500 list of supercomputers.

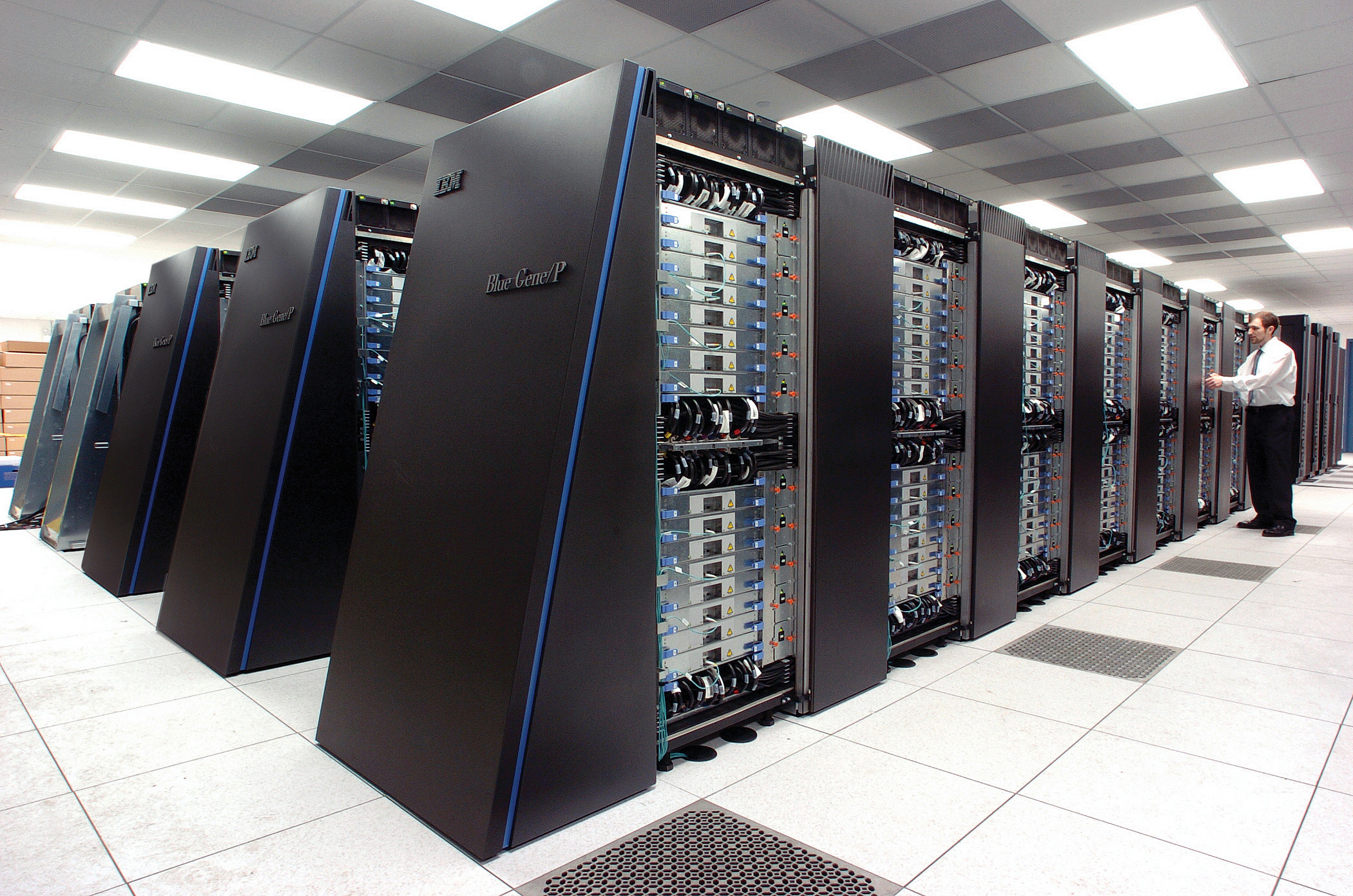
Picture of a supercomputer

== Usage ==
Stallo is operated through NOTUR, the Norwegian Metacenter for Computational Science, and is used for a variety of tasks by universities and industry.

== Statistics ==
Stallo is a 1040 CPU / 9,184 core system employing two versions of Intel Xeon chipsets with a peak performance of 104 TFlop/s. Overall Stallo has 19.7 TB RAM and 155.2 TB internal disk capacity.

== Name ==
The name is taken from a mythical figure in Sami folklore, Stallo.
