= Forschungszentrum Jülich =

Interdisciplinary research centre in Germany

Coordinates: 50°54′18″N 6°24′43″E

Forschungszentrum Jülich GmbH
- Logo since 2018

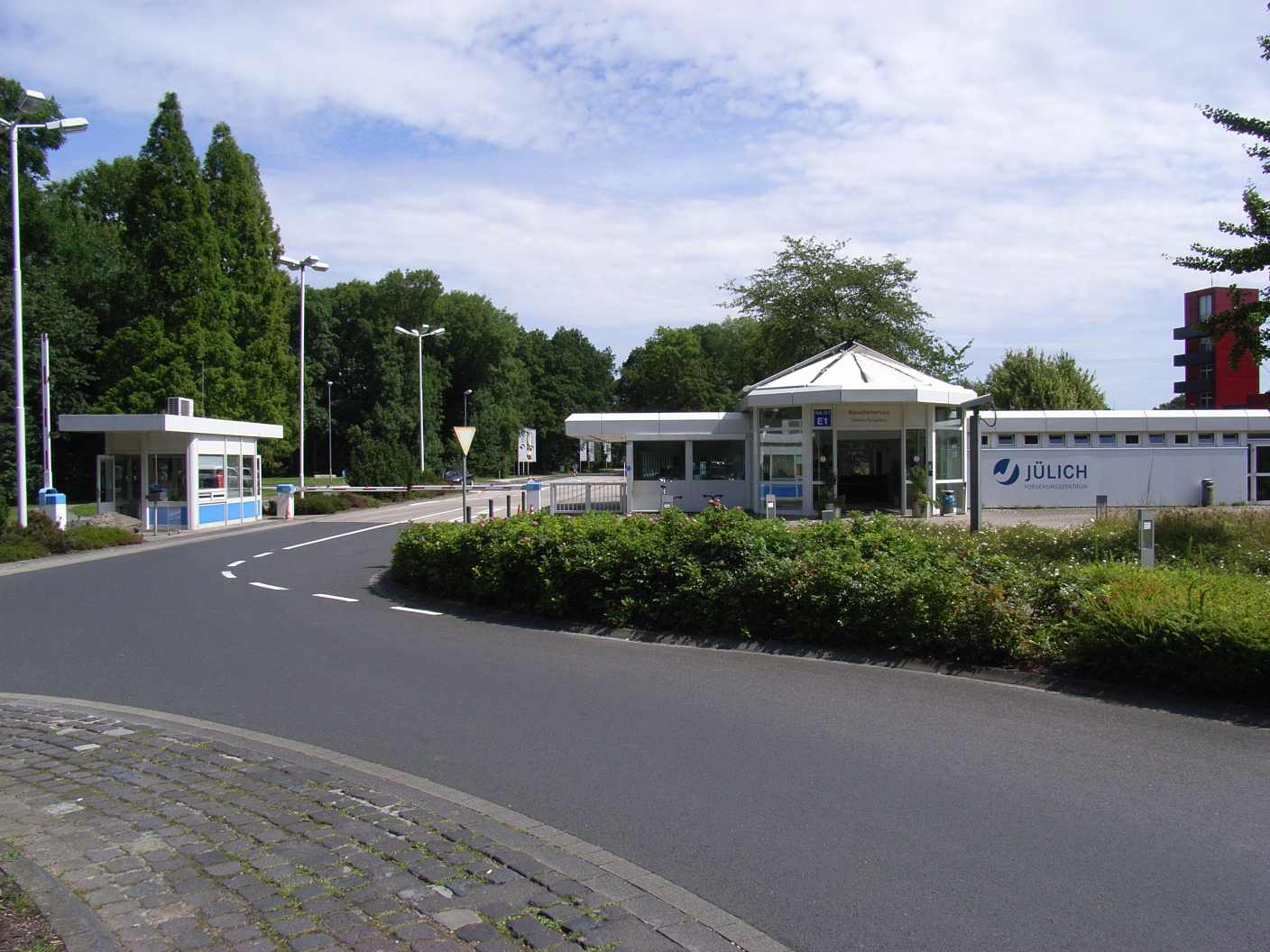
- Main entrance of FZJ in Jülich
- Founded: 11 December 1956
- Headquarters: Jülich, Düren, Germany
- Key people: Astrid Lambrecht (chair)
- Number of employees: 6,800 (2021)
- Parent: Helmholtz Association
- Website: www.fz-juelich.de/portal/EN

Forschungszentrum Jülich GmbH (FZJ; lit. “Jülich Research Centre Limited Liability Company”) is a private company as part of Helmholtz Association with strong national funding that pursues interdisciplinary research in the fields of energy, information, and bioeconomy. It operates a broad range of research infrastructures like supercomputers, an atmospheric simulation chamber, electron microscopes, a particle accelerator, cleanrooms for nanotechnology, among other things. Current research priorities include the structural change in the Rhineland lignite-mining region, hydrogen, and quantum technologies. As a member of the Helmholtz Association with roughly 6,800 employees in ten institutes and 80 subinstitutes, Jülich is one of the largest research institutions in Europe.

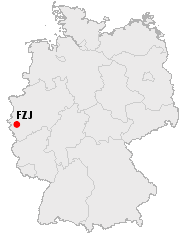
Location in Germany

Forschungszentrum Jülich's headquarters are located between the cities of Aachen, Cologne, and Düsseldorf on the outskirts of the North Rhine-Westphalian town of Jülich. FZJ has 15 branch offices in Germany and abroad, including eight sites at European and international neutron and synchrotron radiation sources, two joint institutes with the University of Münster, Friedrich-Alexander Universität Erlangen-Nürnberg (FAU), and Helmholtz-Zentrum Berlin (HZB), and three offices of Project Management Jülich (PtJ) in the cities of Bonn, Rostock, and Berlin. Jülich cooperates closely with RWTH Aachen University within the Jülich Aachen Research Alliance (JARA).

The institution was established on 11 December 1956 by the state of North Rhine-Westphalia as a registered association before it was renamed Nuclear Research Centre Jülich in 1967. In 1990, its name was changed to "Forschungszentrum Jülich GmbH".

== History ==
On 11 December 1956, the State Parliament of North Rhine-Westphalia decided to establish an "atomic research centre". The Society for the Promotion of Nuclear Physics Research (GFKF) was thus established as a registered association (e. V.). Its founder is considered to be State Secretary Leo Brandt (Ministry of Economic Affairs and Transport of the Federal State of North Rhine-Westphalia). Several locations were considered but the decision was made in favour of the Stetternich forest in what was then the district of Jülich. The Society for the Promotion of Nuclear Physics Research (GFKF) was renamed Nuclear Research Centre Jülich (or KFA for short, which was taken from the German). Seven years later, it was converted into a limited liability company (GmbH), and in 1990, it was named Forschungszentrum Jülich GmbH. The partners of Forschungszentrum Jülich are the Federal Republic of Germany (90%) and the federal state of North Rhine-Westphalia (10%).

=== MERLIN and DIDO ===
In 1958, the foundation stone was laid for the research reactors MERLIN (FRJ-1) and DIDO (FRJ-2), and they went into operation in 1962. The FRJ-1 research reactor was decommissioned in 1985 and completely dismantled between 2000 and 2008. The FRJ-2 research reactor was a DIDO-class reactor and it was used for neutron scattering experiments. It was operated by the Central Research Reactors Division (ZFR). FRJ-2 was the strongest neutron source in Germany until the research neutron source Heinz Maier-Leibnitz in Garching (FRM II) was put in operation. FRJ-2 was primarily used to conduct scattering and spectroscopic experiments on condensed matter. It was in operation from 14 November 1962 until 2 May 2006. In 2006, the Jülich Centre for Neutron Science (JCNS) was founded, reflecting Forschungszentrum Jülich's role as a national competence centre for neutron scattering. Six of the most important instruments were moved from FRJ-2 to FRM II; new instruments were also assembled there.

=== AVR ===
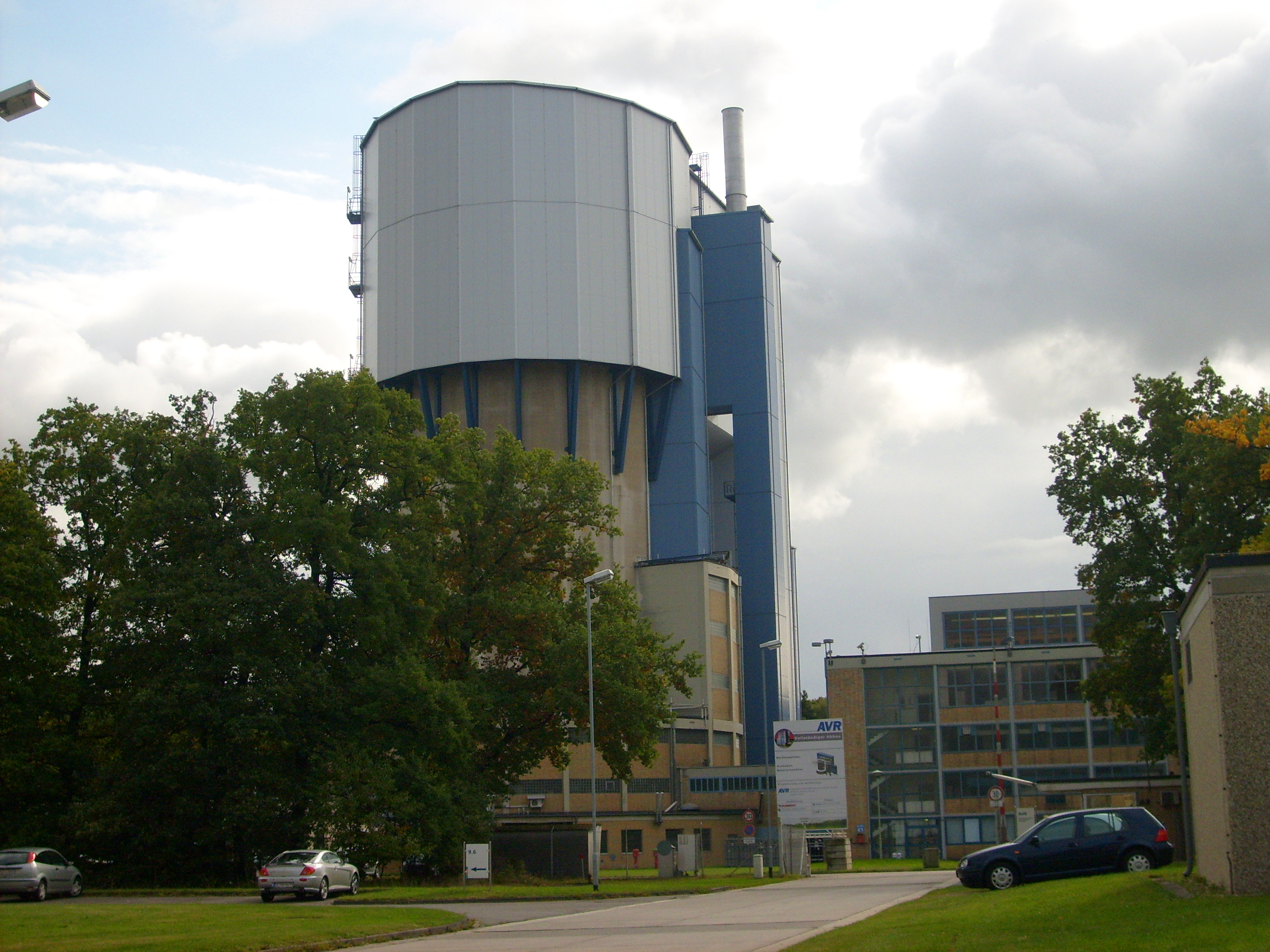
Decommissioned AVR high-temperature reactor

In 1956, an interest group was formed to prepare the construction of the AVR reactor. In 1959, it became the "Arbeitsgemeinschaft Versuchsreaktor GmbH" (AVR GmbH) – a consortium of 15 local electricity suppliers headed by the Düsseldorf municipal utilities (Stadtwerke Düsseldorf) as the owner and operator (other partners included the municipal utilities in Aachen, Bonn, Bremen, Hagen, Hanover, Munich, and Wuppertal). The aim was to demonstrate the feasibility and operability of a graphite-moderated, gas-cooled high-temperature reactor to produce electricity. BBC and Krupp were responsible for construction of the AVR reactor, which began in August 1961 and was completed in 1966, after the consortium had received the design contract in April 1957 and the construction contract in February 1959. The cost of construction was in the region of DM 100 million.

In 1967, the AVR reactor was put into operation and began feeding electricity into the national power grid. On 31 December 1988, the AVR reactor was shut down; during its operation, it had proven the feasibility of the pebble bed reactor. Karl Strauss said in 2016 that "the facility had generally been operated without any problems". The mean availability was 60.4%. AVR received scientific support and operating subsidies from the Nuclear Research Centre Jülich (KFA) but was formally independent. From the mid-1980s, the then KFA reduced its commitment to the further development of the gas-cooled high-temperature reactor.

The AVR pebble bed reactor is still being dismantled today (see its dismantling and disposal). The severe contamination of the reactor core with radioactive graphite dust particles proved particularly difficult. This contamination was caused by the coating of the fuel pellets made of silicon carbide and porous carbon, which leaked under the high temperatures in the reactor core and released radioactive fission product. The BBC and Krupp construction consortium had miscalculated the temperatures in the reactor core as 300 K lower. FZJ solved the problem by filling the reactor core with foamed lightweight concrete, which binds the dust particles and stabilizes the reactor core. Safety researcher Rainer Moormann, who raised public attention to the graphite dust contamination, was awarded the Whistleblower Prize in 2011. Immediately after the Fukushima nuclear disaster, FZJ and AVR GmbH established an independent expert group to investigate the history of the AVR reactor, and in particular, to issue an official statement on Moormann's public disclosures.

=== Fields of research since the 1960s ===
In addition to research on nuclear physics and nuclear energy, work began soon after FZJ's foundation on new, non-nuclear topics and projects, such as environmental research and soil research for agriculture. One of the first institutes to be founded was the Institute of Biology (Botany department) on 1 May 1961. In autumn 1961, the Central Institute for Applied Mathematics (ZAM) was established, combining a mathematical institute with a computer centre, which was unusual at that time. Research into what is now known as neuroscience began in 1964 when the Institute of Nuclear Medicine was founded and radiotracers were developed and used in imaging techniques. Another research priority was understanding solid states as a basis for the investigation and modification of material properties, for example for new materials in energy research. In 1970, the Institute of Solid State Research was established.

In the decades that followed, Jülich expanded its range of research fields to include life sciences, energy and environmental research, materials science, and information technologies. The Institute of Biotechnology was founded in 1977. In 1981, the large-scale facility TEXTOR was put into operation. It was Jülich's fusion experiment for exploring nuclear fusion reactor technology in the field of plasma-wall interaction. The facility was decommissioned at the end of 2013. In 1993, the COSY particle accelerator went into operation. In 1984, the CRAY X-MP supercomputer, one of the fastest computers in the world, was inaugurated at ZAM. ZAM played a pivotal role in founding the first national supercomputing centre (HLRZ) in 1987. In 2007, ZAM became the Jülich Supercomputing Centre (JSC), which today operates the powerful supercomputer JUWELS and makes it available to European researchers.

The new scientific orientation led to a name change and "Forschungszentrum Jülich GmbH" (FZJ) came into being in 1990. Forschungszentrum Jülich is a founding member of the then Association of National Research Centres (AGF, 1970), which became the Helmholtz Association of German Research Centres in 1995. In 2004, the Ernst Ruska-Centre for Electron Microscopy was founded. It is equipped with transmission electron microscopes. Soil and environmental research were interlinked with climate research. In 2001, the SAPHIR atmospheric simulation chamber was inaugurated, followed by the PhyTec experimental facility for plants in 2014. Collaboration with RWTH Aachen University was consolidated in 2007 by establishing the Jülich Aachen Research Alliance (JARA). In 2011, Forschungszentrum Jülich, in partnership with the universities in Aachen, Bonn, Cologne, and Düsseldorf, founded the Bioeconomy Science Center (BioSc) as a scientific centre of excellence for sustainable bioeconomy. FZJ also works closely with the universities in Bonn, Cologne, and Aachen within the Geoverbund ABC/J. In 2011, the ESS Competence Centre was established at Forschungszentrum Jülich. It coordinates the German contributions to the European Spallation Source (ESS) in Lund, Sweden.

== Corporate structure ==
Forschungszentrum Jülich is a limited liability company (GmbH) with the following company bodies: Partners' Meeting, Supervisory Board, and Board of Directors. The Partners' Meeting comprises representatives of the German federal government and state government of North Rhine-Westphalia. The chair of the board of directors is Wolfgang Marquardt, who has been in office since 1 July 2014. The other members of the Board of Directors are – as of October 2021 – Karsten Beneke (vice-chair since 2011), Astrid Lambrecht (since 2021), and Frauke Melchior (since 2021). FZJ's committees are the Scientific Advisory Council and the Scientific and Technical Council (WTR).

=== Finances ===
The annual budget of Forschungszentrum Jülich was approximately €948 million in 2022. Of this, 48% was institutional funding from the German federal government and the state of North Rhine-Westphalia and 52% was external funding. External funding comprises international (EU) and national (federal and state government, DFG, and other) project funding, R&D and infrastructure services (contracts), as well as project management on behalf of the Federal Republic of Germany and the federal state of North Rhine-Westphalia.

=== Employees ===
Forschungszentrum Jülich has 6,796 employees (as of December 2020). Almost 2,700 of these employees are scientists, and of these scientists 850 are doctoral researchers. The scientists work in the natural, life, and engineering sciences in the fields of information, energy, and bioeconomy. Around 867 people work in the administration and service areas; 1,380 individuals work for Project Management Jülich; and 500 employees are classed as technical employees. FZJ also has more than 300 vocational trainees and students on placement in 23 different professions. In 2020, 672 visiting scientists from 62 countries were conducting research at Jülich.

=== Prizes and awards for Jülich employees ===
On 10 December 2007, Peter Grünberg from Forschungszentrum Jülich was awarded the Nobel Prize in Physics together with Albert Fert from Paris-Sud University in France. The two scientists were honoured for the discovery of giant magnetoresistance, which they had made independently of each other. This was the first Nobel Prize for an employee of Forschungszentrum Jülich or the Helmholtz Association. In 1998, Peter Grünberg had been awarded the German Future Prize, and in 2007, he and Albert Fert were joint recipients of the Japan Prize as well as the Israeli Wolf Prize in Physics. The Wolf Prize in Physics was also jointly awarded in 2011 to Knut Urban from Forschungszentrum Jülich, Maximilian Haider from CEOS GmbH, Heidelberg, and Harald Rose from the Technical University of Darmstadt for their breakthrough in electron microscopy. They also received the Japanese Honda Prize in 2008 for the same discovery. In 2002, Maria-Regina Kula und Martina Pohl won the German Future Prize for the development of biological catalysts.

=== Training and teaching at Forschungszentrum Jülich ===
In 2020, more than 300 people trained in 23 different professions at Forschungszentrum Jülich. In cooperation with RWTH Aachen University and Aachen University of Applied Sciences, FZJ also offers dual vocational and academic courses. After successful completion of their final exams, trainees are offered a six-month employment contract in their chosen profession. Since Forschungszentrum Jülich was founded, more than 5,000 trainees have completed their training in more than 25 different professions.

In a joint procedure with the federal state of North Rhine-Westphalia, the institute directors at Forschungszentrum Jülich are appointed professors at one of the neighbouring universities (e.g. in Aachen, Bonn, Cologne, Düsseldorf, Bochum, Duisburg-Essen, Münster) in line with the "Jülich model". In cooperation with the universities, graduate and research schools are established (e.g. International Helmholtz Research School of Biophysics and Soft Matter with the universities in Cologne Düsseldorf). The idea behind this is to support and encourage the interdisciplinary scientific education of doctoral students.

== Research fields and activities ==
=== Research areas ===
Forschungszentrum Jülich groups its research activities into three interdisciplinary strategic research areas: energy, information, and bioeconomy.

==== Information ====
Scientists in the research area of information investigate how information is processed in biological and technical systems. They are working on simulation and data sciences within high-performance computing (HPC) or supercomputing, brain research, and research into bioelectronics- and nanoelectronics-based information technologies with the aim of transferring findings on biological information processing to technical systems. In the field of supercomputing, Jülich develops and operates its own supercomputers (see section on research infrastructures), which can be used for simulation calculations. Brain research also draws on these facilities. Brain research at Jülich aims to shed light on the molecular and structural organization of the brain to better understand illnesses such as Alzheimer's disease. Research is conducted in cooperation with the neighbouring university hospitals in Bonn, Cologne, Aachen, and Düsseldorf.

Research into quantum technologies is associated with the research field of information. This includes work on quantum computers, with components, concepts, and prototypes being developed at Jülich. Forschungszentrum Jülich cooperated with Google in developing the Sycamore quantum computer, and it will be home to the first universal quantum computer developed in Europe as part of the OpenSuperQ project.

=== Energy ===
Jülich research is aimed towards an energy system based on renewable energy sources. This research field is primarily covered by the Institute of Energy and Climate Research (IEK). IEK has 14 subinstitutes that focus on various tasks in collaboration with other institutes. Its research priorities include photovoltaics, fuel cells, and hydrogen as an energy carrier, research into batteries and new methods of energy storage, as well as processes for increasing the efficiency of fossil energy. In the context of the feasibility of the energy transition, Forschungszentrum Jülich explores and models energy systems. With its materials research, the institute is also involved in developing nuclear fusion reactors (such as ITER and Wendelstein 7-X). In the field of producing energy through nuclear fission (atomic energy), FZJ now only conducts research into the disposal of nuclear waste. Two subinstitutes of IEK are involved in atmospheric and climate research, focusing on the interactions between human activities, air quality, and climate, as well as on improving climate and atmospheric models in cooperation with the Jülich Supercomputing Centre.

FZJ, with 265 full-time positions (as of 2019), boasts the largest site for investigating hydrogen technologies within the Helmholtz Association. Research is conducted into the production, conversion, and storage (e.g. in liquid media, liquid organic hydrogen carriers) of hydrogen, as well as into the infrastructure of a hydrogen economy.

=== Sustainable bioeconomy ===
The bioeconomy is an economic system based on the sustainable use of biological resources including plants, animals, and microorganisms. It is argued that a bioeconomy will become necessary due to the finite nature of oil reserves, on which many industrial and everyday products are based, anthropogenic climate change, and the continued growth of the world population. In the area of sustainable bioeconomy, FZJ concentrates on the transition from an oil-based economy to a bioeconomy. This research is conducted in the field of biotechnology in an effort to use renewable raw materials to biotechnologically produce industrially or pharmaceutically relevant base materials. Plant research focuses on optimizing crop yield and the usability of plants as fuels. The third research area at FZJ focuses on chemical and physical processes in soil.

=== Structural change in the Rhineland lignite-mining region ===
The Rhineland lignite-mining region, where FZJ is located, is undergoing an important structural change due to the coal phase-out. The state government of North Rhine-Westphalia aims to transform the region into a European model region for energy supply and resource security. Through its research projects, FZJ will support the successful transformation of the Rhineland region. These projects include the cultivation of novel plants, sustainable agriculture, and the hydrogen economy, as well as collaborations between the field of information and industry, for example in the area of artificial intelligence or data analysis. The aim is to create a locational advantage for innovative enterprises.

== Research infrastructures ==
Forschungszentrum Jülich operates numerous research infrastructures, which are available to internal and external users. FZJ coordinates and is involved in several research infrastructures in the ESFRI Roadmap, which identifies strategically important facilities and platforms in the EU. Examples include the neuroscientific digital platform EBRAINS, the EMPHASIS project for plant phenotyping, the coordination of the European supercomputer network PRACE, and the IAGOS cooperation for research into the Earth's atmosphere using instruments on commercial aircraft. The Ernst Ruska-Centre 2.0 for ultrahigh-resolution electron microscopy and the German contribution to the European Aerosols, Clouds and Trace gases Research Infrastructure (ACTRIS-D) have been part of Germany's National Roadmap since 2019. In this Roadmap, the German Federal Ministry of Education and Research (BMBF) prioritizes infrastructure projects that are important in terms of strategy and research policy.

=== Helmholtz Nano Facility ===
The Helmholtz Nano Facility (HNF) is a facility with a large (1,100 m^{2}) ISO 1–3 classified clean room. The HNF is a central technology platform for the production of nanostructures and circuits within the Helmholtz Association. Work at the HNF focuses on green microchips/computing, quantum computing, neuromorphic computing, bioelectronics, and microfluidics.

=== Ernst Ruska-Centre ===
The Ernst Ruska-Centre for Microscopy and Spectroscopy with Electrons (ER-C) was selected by the German Federal Ministry of Education and Research (BMBF) as a national research infrastructure for ultrahigh-resolution electron microscopy. The electron-optical instruments at ER-C can also be used by external scientists and enterprises. They make it possible to investigate structures at the atomic and molecular level. The PICO electron microscope can be used for this work as it is can correct the lens errors of spherical and chromatic aberration.

=== SAPHIR atmospheric simulation chamber ===
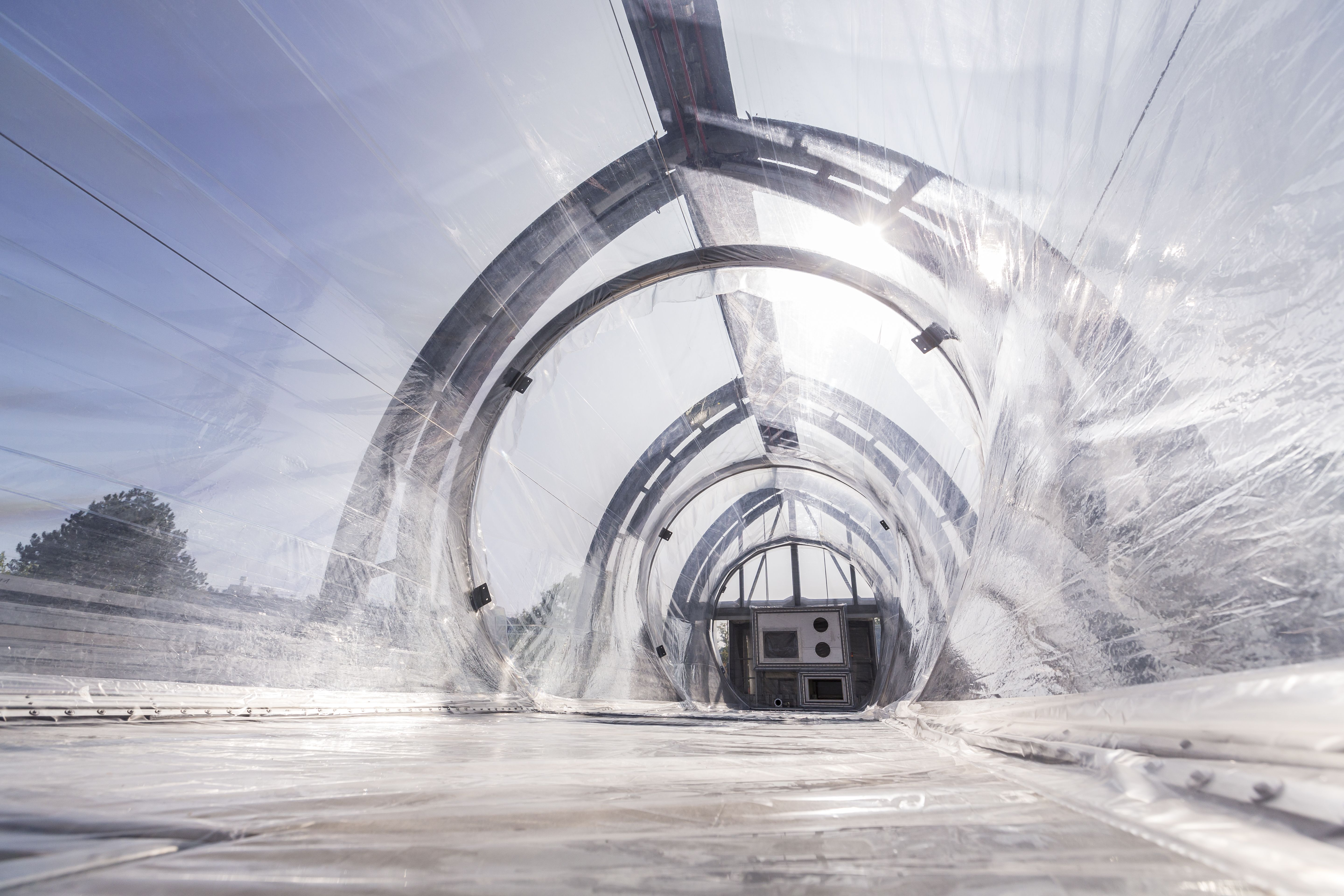
Simulation of atmospheric photochemistry in a large reaction chamber

In the 20-metre-long SAPHIR chamber (Simulation of Atmospheric PHotochemistry In a large Reaction Chamber), the Institute of Energy and Climate Research – Troposphere (IEK-8) explores photochemical reactions in the Earth's atmosphere.

=== Jülich Plant Phenotyping Centre ===
The Jülich Plant Phenotyping Center (JPPC) is a leading international institution for the development and application of non-invasive techniques for quantifying the structure and function of plants. At JPPC, technology is developed and plant traits are analysed on a mechanistic level under high-throughput and field conditions.

=== Supercomputers ===
The Jülich Supercomputing Centre at Forschungszentrum Jülich operates supercomputers of the highest performance class and emerged from the first German high-performance computing centre (HLRZ), which was founded at Jülich in 1987. In 2003, a 1,000 m^{2} machine hall was built for the supercomputers next to the Jülich Supercomputing Centre. JSC joined forces with the High Performance Computing Centre Stuttgart (HLRS) and the Leibniz Supercomputing Centre (LRZ) in Garching near Munich to form the Gauss Centre for Supercomputing (GCS), which unites the three most powerful computing centres under one roof. In addition, JSC coordinates the development of the European supercomputer network PRACE. JSC is headed by physicist and computer scientist Thomas Lippert.

==== JURECA (2015) ====
The JURECA supercomputer replaced JUROPA in 2015 and was expanded to include a GPU-based booster module in 2017. This made JURECA the world's first supercomputer with a modular architecture to be put into productive operation. With a computer performance of 3.78 petaflop/s, the system ranked 29th in the TOP500 list of November 2017. Between autumn 2020 and the beginning of 2021, the JURECA cluster module was replaced by the JURECA-DC module, which is designed to process large volumes of data and increased the system's peak performance to 23.5 petaflop/s.

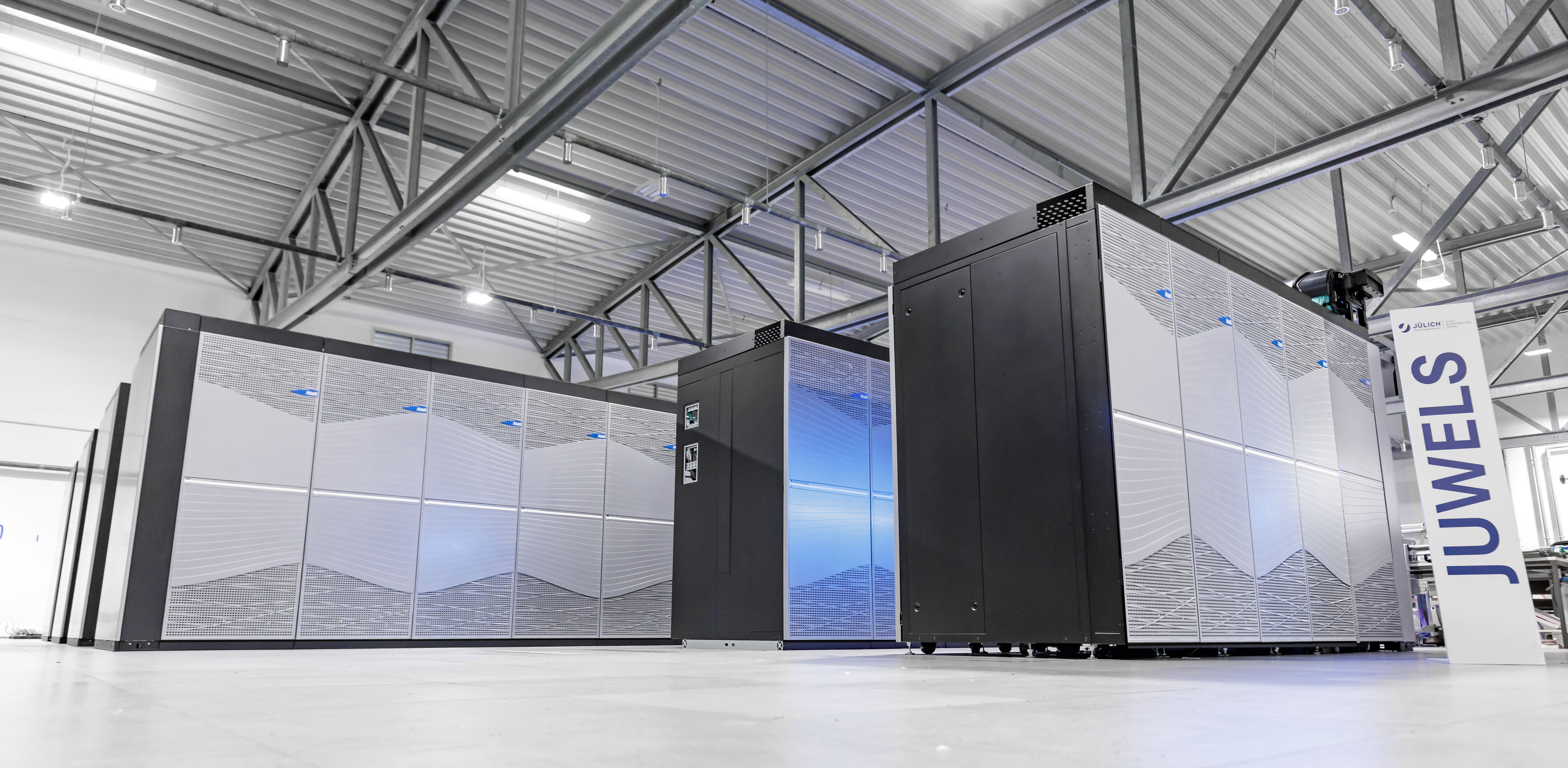

==== JUWELS (2018) ====
The JUWELS supercomputer (Jülich Wizard for European Leadership Science) was put into operation in 2018 and was expanded in 2020 to include a GPU-based booster module. The combined cluster and booster modules have a theoretical peak performance of 85 quadrillion floating point operations per second (85 petaflop/s), which made JUWELS the most powerful supercomputer in Europe and the 7th most powerful in the world when the booster debuted on the November 2020 TOP500 list. Furthermore, the JUWELS booster module was the most energy-efficient system of the ten most powerful computers in the world when it was introduced.

==== JUPITER (2024) ====
As part of the EuroHPC JU the Jülich Supercomputing Centre will host the JUPITER supercomputer (Joint Undertaking Pioneer for Innovative and Transformative Exascale Research), which is to be the first exascale supercomputer in Europe. The machine is being installed in 2024 and should eclipse the threshold of one quintillion ("1" followed by 18 zeros) calculations per second.

=== Medical imaging ===
The Institute of Neurosciences and Medicine (INM) develops and applies medical imaging techniques using MRI and PET for clinical applications and to investigate neurological, neuropsychological, and psychological issues. Equipment at INM includes a combined 3-tesla and 9.4-tesla MRI PET tomograph as well as a 7-tesla, 4-tesla, and 3-tesla MRI system.

=== Research with neutrons ===
Forschungszentrum Jülich is a national competence centre for neutron scattering. The Jülich Centre for Neutron Science (JCNS), which operates instruments at various neutron sources all over the world, was established in 2006 – a few months before the original neutron source (the Jülich research reactor FRJ-2) was decommissioned. Six of the most important instruments were moved from FRJ-2 to FRM II; new instruments were also assembled there. In addition, JCNS has branch offices at the Institut Laue-Langevin (ILL) in Grenoble and at the Spallation Neutron Source (SNS) in Oak Ridge. JCNS also plans to operate instruments at the European Spallation Source (ESS), which is currently being constructed in Lund, Sweden, as well as at future high-brilliance accelerator-driven neutron sources. The instruments will be made available to a wide range of users, for example to conduct research into energy materials and active ingredients for medications or to analyse protein structures and magnetic materials.

=== EBRAINS ===
EBRAINS is a digital, European research infrastructure that was created as part of the EU-funded Human Brain Project (HBP). Forschungszentrum Jülich supports the infrastructure by providing computing capacities for simulations and big data analyses. The aim is to further brain research and to apply scientific findings in this field to innovations inspired by the brain in computing, medicine, and industry.

=== EMPHASIS ===
The European Infrastructure for Multi-Scale Plant Phenomics and Simulation for Food Security in a Changing Climate (EMPHASIS) is a pan-European, distributed infrastructure for plant phenotyping. The aim of this EU platform, which is coordinated by Forschungszentrum Jülich, is to analyse and quantify the external characteristics of plants (the "phenotype") such as the root architecture or the number of leaves. EMPHASIS integrates information systems with data acquisition using mathematical models and helps scientists to analyse plants for a sustainable European agriculture in different environments with the aim of enabling more efficient plant production in a changing climate. The EU has provided €4 million in funding for the creation of the platform.

=== Biomolecular NMR Centre ===
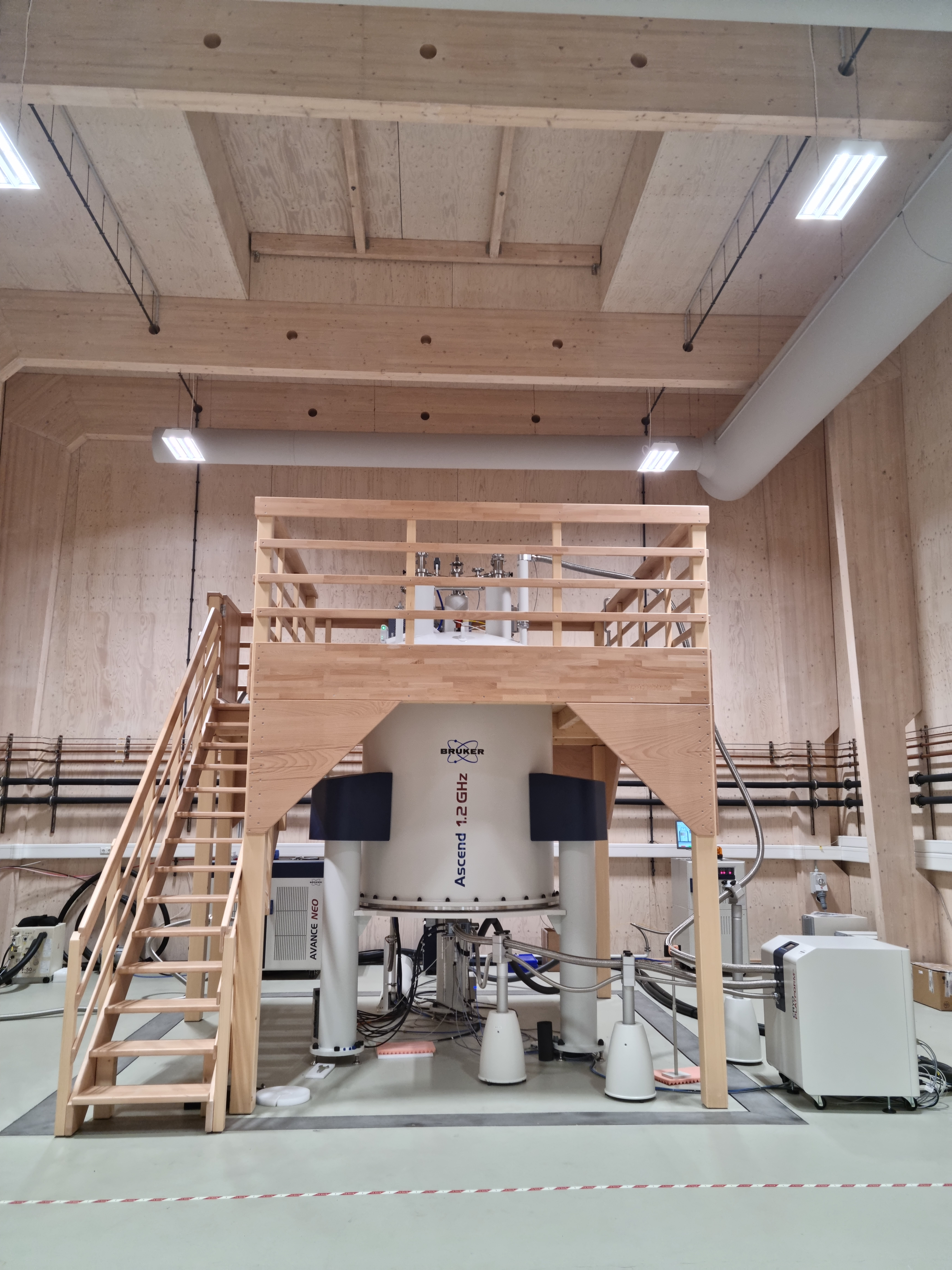
1.2 GHz NMR spectrometer Julich

The Biomolecular NMR Centre is a cooperation between the Institute of Biological Information Processing – Structural Biochemistry at Forschungszentrum Jülich and the Institute of Physical Biology at HHU Düsseldorf. It operates various high-field NMR spectrometers for liquid- and solid-state NMR spectroscopy for research into biologically and medically relevant proteins in order to determine, for example, the three-dimensional structure with a high resolution. This technology is also used to investigate the structural basis for affinities and specificities of these macromolecules in protein-ligand interactions.

The Biomolecular NMR Centre has one 900 MHz NMR spectrometer for liquid-state NMR spectroscopy, one 800 MHz NMR spectrometer for liquid- and solid-state NMR spectroscopy, a 700 MHz device for liquid-state NMR, two 600 MHz devices for liquid-state NMR, and another 600 MHz NMR spectrometer for solid-state NMR spectroscopy. A novel 600 MHz DNP-enhanced solid-state NMR device was installed in 2014.

=== Membrane Centre ===
The Membrane Centre at Forschungszentrum Jülich (approx. 1550 m^{2}) provides a research infrastructure for the development of membrane systems, covering the entire spectrum of services from the production of the materials needed and the characterization using analytical instruments right up to the testing of modules and components. A priority is the development of novel membrane systems for energy technology in order to separate greenhouse gases from exhaust gases and to provide a basis for novel fuel cells and solid-state batteries.

== Other research projects ==
Forschungszentrum Jülich has a lattice steel mast (124 metres high) for meteorological measurements. It is equipped with platforms at 10 m, 20 m, 30 m, 50 m, 80 m, 100 m, and 120 m, on which measuring instruments are positioned. The measuring mast was erected in 1963/4 and is a triangular steel framework construction.

== Former research activities ==
=== Early supercomputers ===
==== IBM p690 cluster "Jump" (2004) ====
The massively parallel supercomputer IBM p690 cluster Jump was put into operation at the beginning of 2004. With 1,312 Power4+ 2C 1.7 GHz processors (41 nodes, each with 32 processors) and an internal memory of 5 terabytes (128 gigabytes per node), the computer had a maximum performance of 5.6 teraflop/s. It was ranked 30th in the list of the world's most powerful computers at the time of its inauguration. The nodes were connected to each other by a high performance switch (HPS). Through a globally parallel data system, applications had access to more than 60 terabytes of storage space and an integrated tape drive with a capacity of one petabyte. The IBM p690 cluster Jump was run on the operating system AIX 5.1. In 2008, the system was temporarily replaced by IBM Power6 p6 575 until JuRoPA began operating.

==== Jülich BlueGene/L supercomputer (JUBL, 2006) ====
JUBL was unveiled in 2006 and is considered to be JUGENE's predecessor. It was decommissioned following JUGENE's successful installation in mid-2008.

==== Jülich BlueGene/P supercomputer (JUGENE, 2008) ====
On 22 February 2008, the massively parallel supercomputer JUGENE, which was based on IBM's BlueGene/P architecture, went into operation. At times, it was the fastest computer in Europe and the fastest civil computer in the world. In 2012, it was replaced by JUQUEEN.

==== HPC-FF and JuRoPA (2009) ====
On 26 May 2009, the two computers HPC-FF and JuRoPA went into operation. The two computers could be connected for specific tasks and together they achieved a performance of 274.8 teraflop/s with Linpack, which placed them tenth worldwide. The operating system was SUSE Linux Enterprise Server. This meant that three computers were effectively in operation in 2009. Both computers were decommissioned in June 2015 and replaced by JURECA.

- HPC-FF – A computer built by Bull for fusion research with 1080 cluster nodes, each with two Xeon quad-core processors (Xeon X5570, 2.93 GHz).
- JuRoPA was built by Sun with 4416 Xeon X5570 processors (2208 processor nodes).

==== JUQUEEN (2012) ====
The supercomputer known as JUQUEEN went into operation in 2012. It has a peak performance of 5.9 petaflop/s and was Europe's fastest supercomputer at the time of its inauguration.

=== Cooler synchrotron (COSY) ===
The COSY cooler synchrotron was a particle accelerator (synchrotron) and storage ring (circumference: 184 m) for accelerating protons and deuterons operated by the Nuclear Physics Institute (IKP) at FZJ, which was operated until October 2023.

COSY was characterized by beam cooling, which reduces the deviation of particles from their predetermined path (can also be understood as the thermal motion of particles) using electron or stochastic cooling. At COSY, there were a number of experimental facilities for studies in the field of hadron physics. Recently, research focused on investigating the electric dipole moment of protons, testing components and methods for the planned Facility for Antiproton and Ion Research, and on preparatory experiments constructing an accelerator-based neutron source. Previous core experiments such as the ANKE magnetic spectrometer, the TOF time-of-flight mass spectrometer, and the WASA universal detector, which was moved to COSY from the CELSIUS storage ring of The Svedberg Labors (TSL) in Uppsala, have been decommissioned and mostly dismantled. The synchrotron was used by scientists from German and international research institutions at internal and external target stations. It was one of the research facilities used for collaborative research funded by the German Federal Ministry of Education and Research.

== Institutes ==
Ernst-Ruska-Centre for Microscopy and Spectroscopy with Electrons (ER-C):

- Physics of Nanoscale Systems (ER-C-1/PPGI-5)
- Materials Science and Technology (ER-C-2)
- Structural Biology (ER-C-3)

Institute for Advanced Simulation (IAS):

- Jülich Supercomputing Centre (JSC)
- Quantum Theory of Materials (PGI-1/IAS-1)
- Theoretical Physics of Living Matter and Biophysics (IBI-5/IAS-2)
- Theoretical Nanoelectronics (PGI-2/IAS-3)
- Theory of the Strong Interactions (IAS-4/IKP-3)
- Computational Biomedicine (IAS-5/INM-9)
- Theoretical Neuroscience (IAS-6/INM-6)
- Civil Safety Research (IAS-7)
- Data Analytics and Machine Learning (IAS-8)
- Materials Data Science and Informatics (IAS-9)

Institute of Bio- and Geosciences (IBG):

- Biotechnology (IBG-1)
- Plant Sciences (IBG-2)
- Agrosphere (IBG-3)
- Bioinformatics (IBG-4)

Institute of Biological Information Processing (IBI):

- Molecular and Cellular Physiology (IBI-1)
- Mechanobiology (IBI-2)
- Bioelectronics (IBI-3)
- Biomacromolecular Systems and Processes (IBI-4)
- Theoretical Physics of Living Matter and Biophysics (IBI-5/IAS-2)
- Cellular Structural Biology (IBI-6)
- Structural Biochemistry (IBI-7)
- Neutron Scattering and Biological Matter (JCNS-1/IBI-8)
- Technical Services and Administration (IBI-TA)

Institute of Energy and Climate Research (IEK):

- Materials Synthesis and Processing (IEK-1)
- Microstructure and Properties of Materials (IEK-2)
- Techno-Economic Systems Analysis (IEK-3)
- Plasma Physics (IEK-4)
- Photovoltaics (IEK-5)
- Nuclear Waste Management and Reactor Safety (IEK-6)
- Stratosphere (IEK-7)
- Troposphere (IEK-8)
- Fundamental Electrochemistry (IEK-9)
- Energy Systems Engineering (IEK-10)
- Systems Analysis and Technology Evaluation (IEK-STE)
- Helmholtz Institute Erlangen-Nürnberg for Renewable Energy (IEK-11/HI ERN)
- Helmholtz Institute Münster (IEK-12/HI MS)
- Theory and Computation of Energy Materials (IEK-13)
- Electrochemical Process Engineering (IEK-14)

Institute of Neuroscience and Medicine (INM):

- Structural and Functional Organization of the Brain (INM-1)
- Molecular Organization of the Brain (INM-2)
- Cognitive Neuroscience (INM-3)
- Medical Imaging Physics (INM-4)
- Nuclear Chemistry (INM-5)
- Computational and Systems Neuroscience (INM-6)
- Brain and Behaviour (INM-7)
- Ethics of Neuroscience (INM-8)
- Computational Biomedicine (INM-9/IAS-5)
- JARA Institute Brain structure-function relationships (INM-10)
- JARA Institute Molecular neuroscience and neuroimaging (INM-11)

Institute for Sustainable Hydrogen Economy (INW)

Jülich Centre for Neutron Science (JCNS):

- Neutron Scattering and Biological Matter (JCNS-1/IBI-8)
- Quantum Materials and Collective Phenomena (JCNS-2/PGI-4)
- Neutron Analytics for Energy Research (JCNS-3)
- Neutron Methods (JCNS-4)
- Technical Services and Administration (PGI-TA/JCNS-TA)

Nuclear Physics Institute (IKP):

- Experimental Hadron Structure (IKP-1)
- Experimental Hadron Dynamics (IKP-2)
- Theory of the Strong Interactions (IAS-4/IKP-3)
- Large-Scale Nuclear Physics Equipment (IKP-4)

Peter Grünberg Institute (PGI):

- Quantum Theory of Materials (PGI-1/IAS-1)
- Theoretical Nanoelectronics (PGI-2/IAS-3)
- Quantum Nanoscience (PGI-3)
- Quantum Materials and Collective Phenomena (PGI-4/JCNS-2)
- Microstructure Research (PGI-5)
- Electronic Properties (PGI-6)
- Electronic Materials (PGI-7)
- Quantum Control (PGI-8)
- Semiconductor Nanoelectronics (PGI-9)
- JARA Institute Energy-efficient information technology (PGI-10)
- JARA Institute for Quantum Information (PGI-11)
- Quantum Computing Analytics (PGI-12)
- Quantum Computing (PGI-13)
- Neuromorphic Compute Nodes (PGI-14)
- Neuromorphic Software Ecosystms (PGI-15)
- Technical Services and Administration (PGI-TA/JCNS-TA)

Central Institute of Engineering, Electronics and Analytics (ZEA):

- Engineering and Technology (ZEA-1)
- Electronic Systems (ZEA-2)
- Analytics (ZEA-3)

== Location and accessibility ==
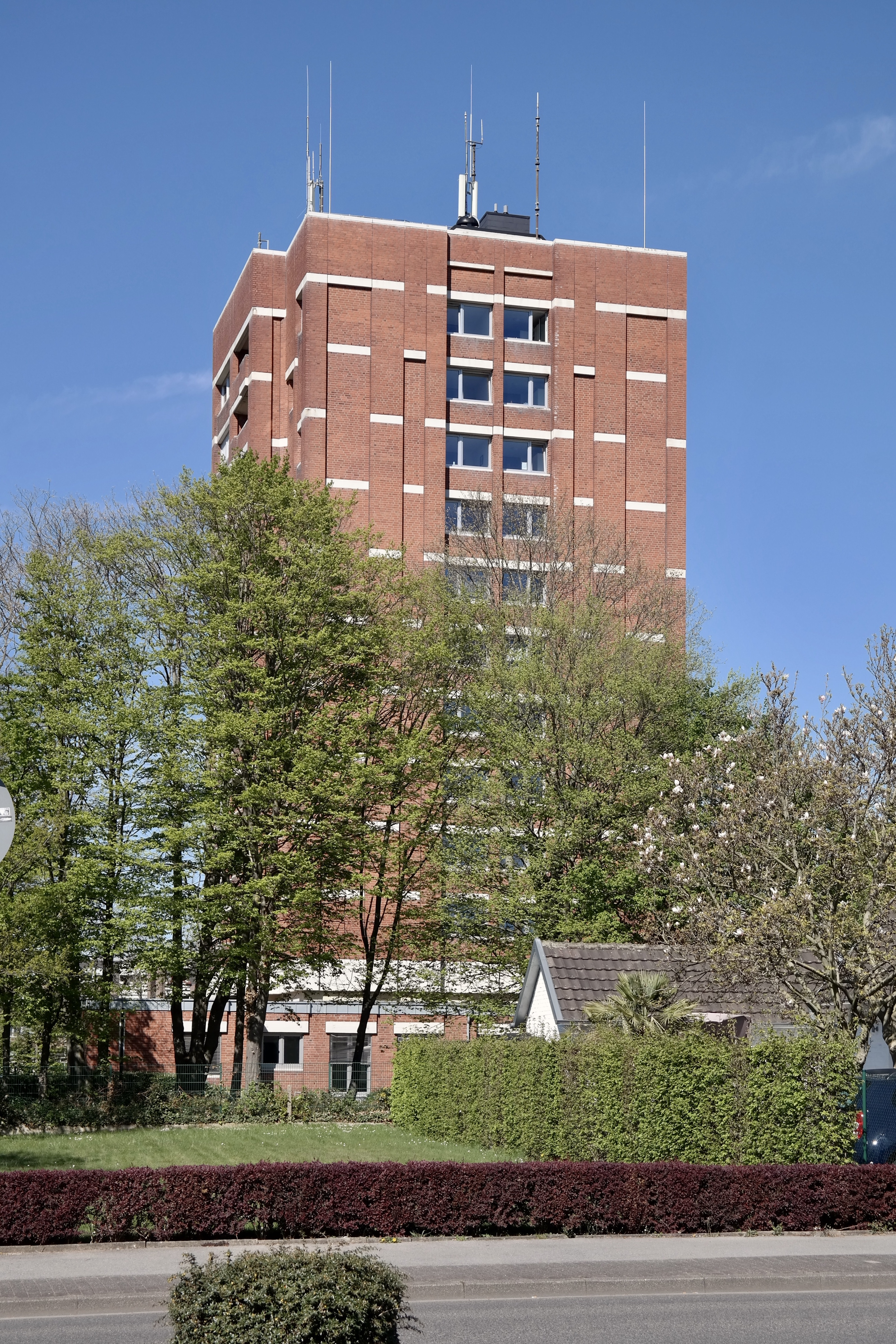
Guesthouse of the FZJ in the city center of Jülich

Forschungszentrum Jülich is situated in the middle of the Stetternich Forest in Jülich (Düren district, North Rhine-Westphalia) and covers an area of 2.2 square kilometres. It is located about 4 km to the south-east of Jülich, approx. 30 km to the north-east of Aachen, and 45 km to the west of Cologne. Some of the facilities of Forschungszentrum Jülich are not located on campus but about 1 km west of campus on the premises of the former federal railways repair shop (BAW).

== Infrastructure ==
In addition to the scientific institutes and the large-scale facilities, Forschungszentrum Jülich has several infrastructure divisions and central institutes, including for example a Works Fire Brigade that is staffed 24/7, ready to protect people, property, animals, and the nature in and around Forschungszentrum Jülich. The aim of the work at the Medical Service is to ensure healthy working conditions at Forschungszentrum Jülich. The services offered range from occupational health and safety to emergency medical care and psychosocial counselling.

On campus, the State Institute for Occupational Safety (LAfA) for North Rhine-Westphalia operates a state collection centre for radioactive waste for North Rhine-Westphalia and Lower Saxony. This collection centre accepts radioactive waste from Forschungszentrum Jülich as well as other (low-level) radioactive waste from the two aforementioned federal states.

Since 1979, Forschungszentrum Jülich has also had its own railway track for freight transport, which is a dead-end track within campus.
