= Joe Z. Tsien =

American neuroscientist

Joe Z. Tsien（钱卓） is an American neuroscientist who researched Cre/lox-neurogenetics in the mid-1990s He also was involved in research on Doogie mice in the late 1990s while he was a faculty member at Princeton University. He has also worked on theories of neural computation, intelligence, cognition, memory, decision-making, and spatial navigation.

== Education ==
Tsien earned his A.B. in Biology/Physiology from East China Normal University in Shanghai (1984). Tsien obtained his Ph.D. in Molecular Biology from the University of Minnesota in 1990.

== Career ==
In the early and mid-1990s, Tsien worked with two Nobel laureates, Eric Kandel and Susumu Tonegawa at Columbia University and MIT, respectively. In 1997, Tsien became a faculty member in the Department of Molecular Biology at Princeton University, where he genetically engineered and created Doogie, a smart mouse. In 2007, Tsien launched the Brain Decoding Project under which he has led a team of neuroscientists, computer scientists and mathematicians to record and decipher systematically the neural codes in the mouse brain, with funding supported in part by Georgia Research Alliance. Tsien's Brain Decoding Project has provided a valuable test case and inspiration for other neuroscientists in Europe and the United States to initiate large-scale projects such as the BRAIN Initiative and Human BRAIN Projects in 2013.

Tsien is currently working in China and continues to serve as the director of the International Brain Decoding Project Consortium.

== Research ==
While at MIT, Tsien pioneered Cre-loxP-mediated brain subregion- and cell type-specific genetic techniques in 1996, enabling researchers to manipulate or introduce any gene in a specific brain region or a given type of neuron. This technique has led to NIH Blueprint for Neuroscience Research in launching several Cre-driver Mouse Resource projects. Cre-lox recombination-mediated neurogenetics has been used for cell-specific gene knockouts, transgenic overexpression, neural circuit tracing, Brainbow, optogenetics, CLARITY, voltage imaging and chemical genetics.

Tsien was involved in the creation of the smart mouse Doogie. While a faculty member at Princeton University, Tsien and collaborators found that one of the NMDA receptor's subunits holds the key for superior learning and memory at young ages. Accordingly, his laboratory genetically engineered a transgenic mouse in which they over-expressed the NR2B subunit of the NMDA receptor in the mouse cortex and hippocampus. In 1999, his team reported that the transgenic mouse, nicknamed Doogie, appeared to have enhanced synaptic plasticity and enhanced learning and retention, as well as greater flexibility in learning new patterns. The discovery of the NR2B as a key genetic factor for memory enhancement prompted other researchers to discover over two dozen other genes for memory enhancement, many of which regulate the NR2B pathway. One of the NR2B-based memory-enhancement strategies, via dietary supplements of a brain-penetrating magnesium ion, magnesium L-threonate, is currently undergoing clinical trials for memory improvement.

Tsien was involved in research on the unified cell-assembly mechanism for explaining how episodic memory and semantic memory are generated in the memory circuits. His laboratory also discovered the nest cells in the mouse brain, revealing how animals actually encode the abstract concept of nest or home.

Tsien is also showed that defective Alzheimer's genes (e.g. presenilin-1) impaired adult neurogenesis in the dentate gyrus of the hippocampus, revealing the role of adult neurogenesis in memory clearance. His team showed that the deletion (complete inhibition) of presenilin-1 and presenilin-2 led to early-onset Alzheimer's like neurodegeneration, such as the shrinkage of the cortex and hippocampus, enlargement of the ventricules and drastic brain inflammation including biomarkers for neuronal atrophy, astrogliosis, caspase-3-mediated apoptosis, and tau hyperphosphorylation, abnormal higher levels of GFAP. This work may have implications for screening people at high risk for dementia and for early intervention.

In 2015, Tsien developed the Theory of Connectivity to explain the design principle upon which evolution and development may construct the brain to be capable of generating intelligence. This theory has made six predictions which have received supportive evidence by a recent set of experiments on both the mouse brain and hamster brain. At its core, the Theory of Connectivity predicts that the cell assemblies in the brain are not random, rather they should conform to the power-of-two-based equation, N = 2^{i} - 1, to form the pre-configured building block termed as the functional connectivity motif (FCM). Instead of using a single neuron as the computational unit in some extremely simple brains, the theory denotes that in most brains, a group of neurons exhibiting similar tuning properties, termed as a neural clique, should serve as the basic computing processing unit (CPU). Defined by the power-of-two-based equation, N = 2^{i} - 1, each FCM consists of principal-projection neuron cliques (N), ranging from those specific cliques receiving specific information inputs (i) to those general and sub-general cliques receiving various combinatorial convergent inputs.

As the evolutionarily conserved logic, the validation of Theory of Connectivity requires experimental demonstrations of the following basic properties: 1) Anatomical prevalence - FCMs are prevalent across neural circuits, regardless of gross anatomical shapes; 2) Species conservancy - FCMs are conserved across different animal species; and 3) Cognitive universality - FCMs serve as a universal computational logic at the cell-assembly level for processing a variety of cognitive experiences and flexible behaviors. 4) More importantly, this Theory of Connectivity further predicts that the specific-to-general combinatorial connectivity pattern within FCMs should be pre-configured by evolution, and emerge innately from development as the brain's computational primitives. 5) This Theory of Connectivity also explains the general purpose and computational algorithm of the neocortex. This proposed design principle of intelligence can be examined via various experiments and also be modeled by neuromorphic engineers and computer scientists. The same power-of-two-based permutation logic has recently been described for lexical retrieval processes in humans, which shows parallels to the computing base of the quantum computer. However, Dr. Joe Tsien cautions that artificial general intelligence based on the brain's principles can come with great benefits and, potentially, even greater risks.

Moreover, Tsien lab has focused on the cracking of real-time neural code—the rule under which information is signaled to generate the moment-to-moment cognitions including seeing a car, recalling a memory or being consciously aware of time and location. Traditionally, the rate code, which firing spike rasters were averaged over multiple trials to overcome firing variability, was proposed as a way for scientists to anaylyze the tuning properties of a given neuron. However, it is obvious the rate code is not how the brain actually uses to represent real-time cognitions due to the enormous firing variabiity from one moment to another. To solve this fundamental problem, Tsien has proposed the Neural Self-Information Theory which states that the interspike-interval (ISI), or the silence-duration between 2 adjoining spikes, carries self-information that is inversely proportional to its variability-probability. Specifically, higher-probability ISIs convey minimal information because they reflect the ground state, whereas lower-probability ISIs carry more information, in the form of "positive" or "negative surprisals", signifying the excitatory or inhibitory shifts from the ground state, respectively. These surprisals serve as the quanta of information to construct temporally coordinated cell-assembly ternary codes representing real-time cognitions.

Accordingly, Tsien devised a general decoding method and unbiasedly uncovered 15 cell assemblies underlying different sleep cycles, fear-memory experiences, spatial navigation, and 5-choice serial-reaction time (5CSRT) visual-discrimination behaviors. His team revealed that robust cell-assembly codes were generated by ISI surprisals constituted of ~20% of the skewed ISI gamma-distribution tails, conforming to the "Pareto Principle" that specifies, for many events—including communication—roughly 80% of the output or consequences come from 20% of the input or causes. These results demonstrate that real-time neural codes arise from the temporal assembly of neural-clique members via ISI variability-based self-information principle.

== Recognition ==
Tsien has received awards for his research contributions, including:

- 2012 Distinguished Scientist Award from the International Behavioral and Neural Genetics Society
- Keck Distinguished Young Scholar Award
- Burroughs Wellcome Young Investigator Award
- Scientific Achievement Award from the Association of Chinese Americans
- Beckman Young Investigator Award

Tsien's work on the creation of smart mouse was also selected for TIME magazine cover story in 1999 as well as New York Times's Scientist At Work section story.

== Popular science ==
Due to his breakthrough in discoveries of brain mechanisms, Tsien has been invited to contribute two cover-story articles for Scientific American in the areas of neuroscience of memory enhancement and memory decoding.
