= Blue Brain Project =

Swiss brain research initiative

The Blue Brain Project was a Swiss brain research initiative that aimed to create a digital reconstruction of the mouse brain. The project was founded in May 2005 by the Brain Mind Institute of École Polytechnique Fédérale de Lausanne (EPFL) in Switzerland. The project ended in December 2024. Its mission was to use biologically detailed digital reconstructions and simulations of the mammalian brain to identify the fundamental principles of brain structure and function.

The project was headed by the founding director Henry Markram—who also launched the European Human Brain Project—and was co-directed by Felix Schürmann, Adriana Salvatore and Sean Hill. Using a Blue Gene supercomputer running Michael Hines's NEURON, the simulation involved a biologically realistic model of neurons and an empirically reconstructed model connectome.

There were a number of collaborations, including the Cajal Blue Brain, which is coordinated by the Supercomputing and Visualization Center of Madrid (CeSViMa), and others run by universities and independent laboratories.

== History ==
In 2006, the project made its first model of a neocortical column with simplified neurons. In November 2007, it completed an initial model of the rat neocortical column. This marked the end of the first phase, delivering a data-driven process for creating, validating, and researching the neocortical column.

Neocortical columns are considered by some researchers to be the smallest functional units of the neocortex, and they are thought to be responsible for higher functions such as conscious thought. In humans, each column is about 2 mm (0.079 in) in length, has a diameter of 0.5 mm (0.020 in) and contains about 60,000 neurons. Rat neocortical columns are very similar in structure but contain only 10,000 neurons and 10^{8} synapses.

In 2009, Henry Markram claimed that a "detailed, functional artificial human brain can be built within the next 10 years". He conceived the Human Brain Project, to which the Blue Brain Project contributed, and which became funded in 2013 by the European Union with up to $1.3 billion.

In 2015, the project simulated part of a rat brain with 30,000 neurons. Also in 2015, scientists at École Polytechnique Fédérale de Lausanne (EPFL) developed a quantitative model of the previously unknown relationship between the neurons and the astrocytes. This model describes the energy management of the brain through the function of the neuro-glial vascular unit (NGV). The additional layer of neuron and glial cells is being added to Blue Brain Project models to improve functionality of the system.

In 2017, Blue Brain Project discovered that neural cliques connected to one another in up to eleven dimensions. The project's director suggested that the difficulty of understanding the brain is partly because the mathematics usually applied for studying neural networks cannot detect that many dimensions. The Blue Brain Project was able to model these networks using algebraic topology.

In 2018, Blue Brain Project released its first digital 3D brain cell atlas which, according to ScienceDaily, is like "going from hand-drawn maps to Google Earth", providing information about major cell types, numbers, and positions in 737 regions of the brain.

In 2019, Idan Segev, one of the computational neuroscientists working on the Blue Brain Project, gave a talk titled: "Brain in the computer: what did I learn from simulating the brain." In his talk, he mentioned that the whole cortex for the mouse brain was complete and virtual EEG experiments would begin soon. He also mentioned that the model had become too heavy on the supercomputers they were using at the time, and that they were consequently exploring methods in which every neuron could be represented as an artificial neural network.

In 2022, scientists at the Blue Brain Project used algebraic topology to create an algorithm, Topological Neuronal Synthesis, that generates a large number of unique cells using only a few examples, synthesizing millions of unique neuronal morphologies. This allows them to replicate both healthy and diseased states of the brain. In a paper Kenari et al. were able to digitally synthesize dendritic morphologies from the mouse brain using this algorithm. They mapped entire brain regions from just a few reference cells. Since it is open source, this will enable the modelling of brain diseases and eventually, the algorithm could lead to digital twins of brains.

== Software ==
The Blue Brain Project has developed a number of software to reconstruct and to simulate the mouse brain. All software tools mentioned below are open source software and available for everyone on GitHub.

=== Blue Brain Nexus ===
Blue Brain Nexus is a data integration platform which uses a knowledge graph to enable users to search, deposit, and organise data. It stands on the FAIR data principles to provide flexible data management solutions beyond neuroscience studies.

=== BluePyOpt ===
BluePyOpt is a tool that is used to build electrical models of single neurons. For this, it uses evolutionary algorithms to constrain the parameters to experimental electrophysiological data. Attempts to reconstruct single neurons using BluePyOpt are reported by Rosanna Migliore, and Stefano Masori.

=== CoreNEURON ===
CoreNEURON is a supplemental tool to NEURON, which allows large scale simulation by boosting memory usage and computational speed.

=== NeuroMorphoVis ===
NeuroMorphoVis is a visualisation tool for morphologies of neurons.

=== SONATA ===
SONATA is a joint effort between Blue Brain Project and Allen Institute for Brain Science, to develop a standard for data format, which realises a multiple platform working environment with greater computational memory and efficiency.

== Funding ==
The project was funded primarily by the Swiss government and the Future and Emerging Technologies (FET) Flagship grant from the European Commission, and secondarily by grants and donations from private individuals. The EPFL bought the Blue Gene computer at a reduced cost because it was still a prototype and IBM was interested in exploring how applications would perform on the machine. BBP was viewed as a validation of the Blue Gene supercomputer concept.

== Related projects ==
=== Cajal Blue Brain ===
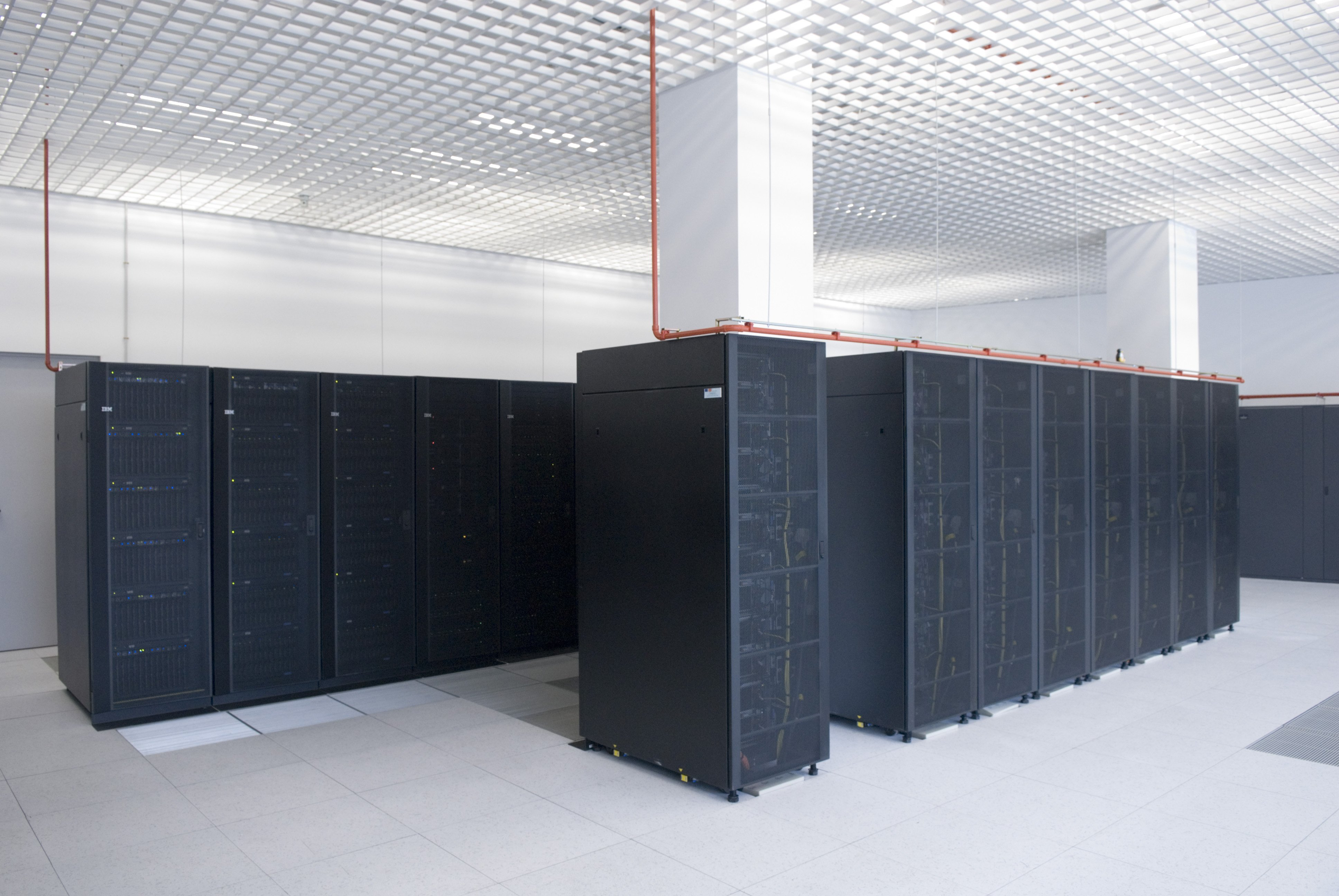
Cajal Blue Brain used the Magerit supercomputer (CeSViMa)

The Cajal Blue Brain Project is coordinated by the Technical University of Madrid led by Javier de Felipe and uses the facilities of the Supercomputing and Visualization Center of Madrid and its supercomputer Magerit. The Cajal Institute also participates in this collaboration. The main lines of research currently being pursued at Cajal Blue Brain include neurological experimentation and computer simulations. Nanotechnology, in the form of a newly designed brain microscope, plays an important role in its research plans.

=== Documentary ===
Noah Hutton created the documentary film In Silico over a 10-year period. The film was released in April 2021. The film covers the "shifting goals and landmarks" of the Blue Brain Project as well as the drama, "In the end, this isn't about science. It's about the universals of power, greed, ego, and fame."

== See also ==
- Artificial intelligence
- BRAIN Initiative
- China Brain Project
- CoDi
- Cognitive architecture
- Cognitive science
- Google Brain
- List of artificial intelligence projects
- Neuroinformatics
- OpenWorm
- Outline of brain mapping
- Outline of the human brain
- Project Joshua Blue
- Simulation argument
- Simulated reality
- Social simulation
- Whole brain emulation
