= Spanish Supercomputing Network =

Distributed infrastructure involving the interconnection of 12 supercomputers in Spain

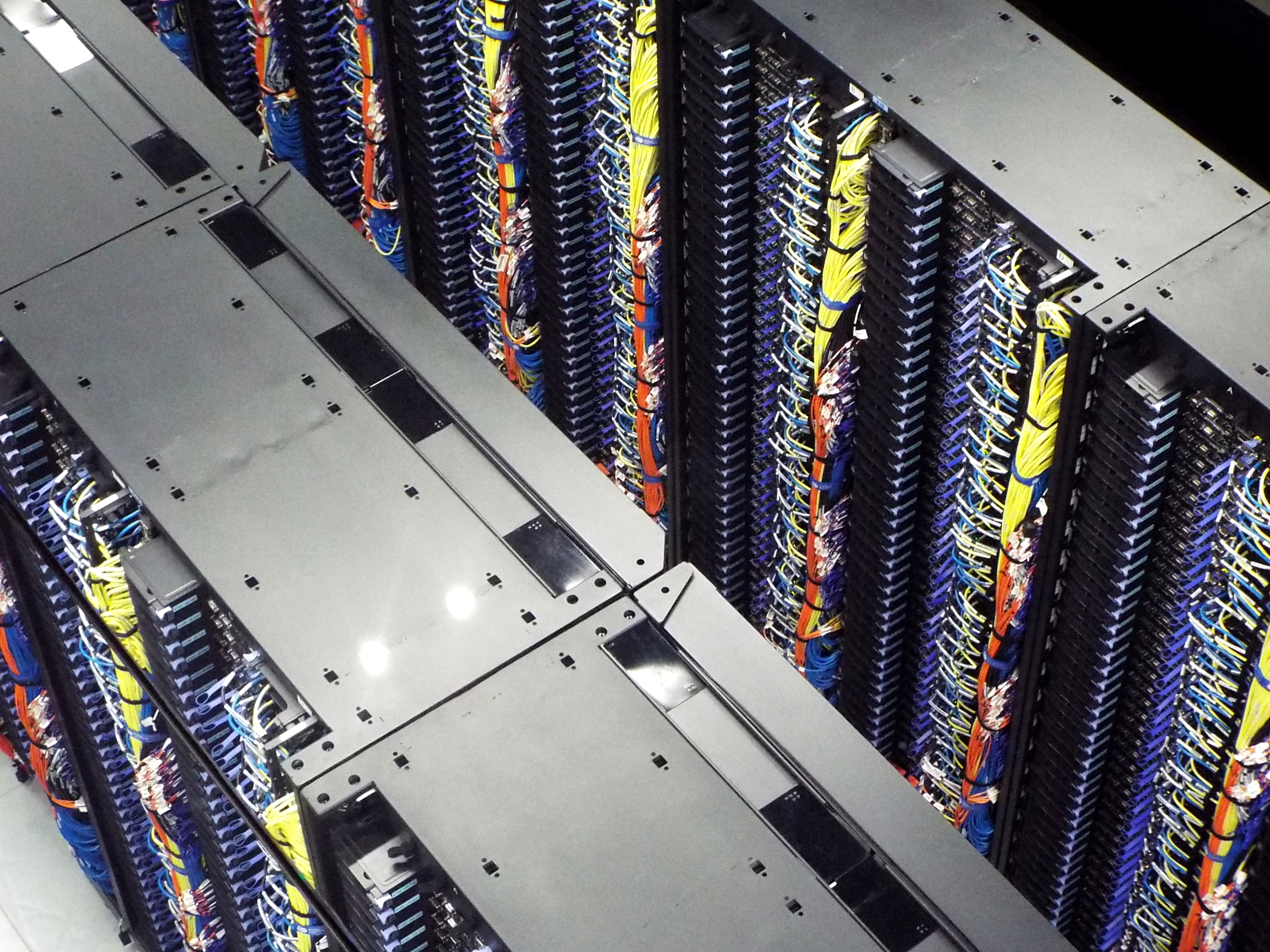
MareNostrum III Supercomputer (Barcelona Supercomputing Center)

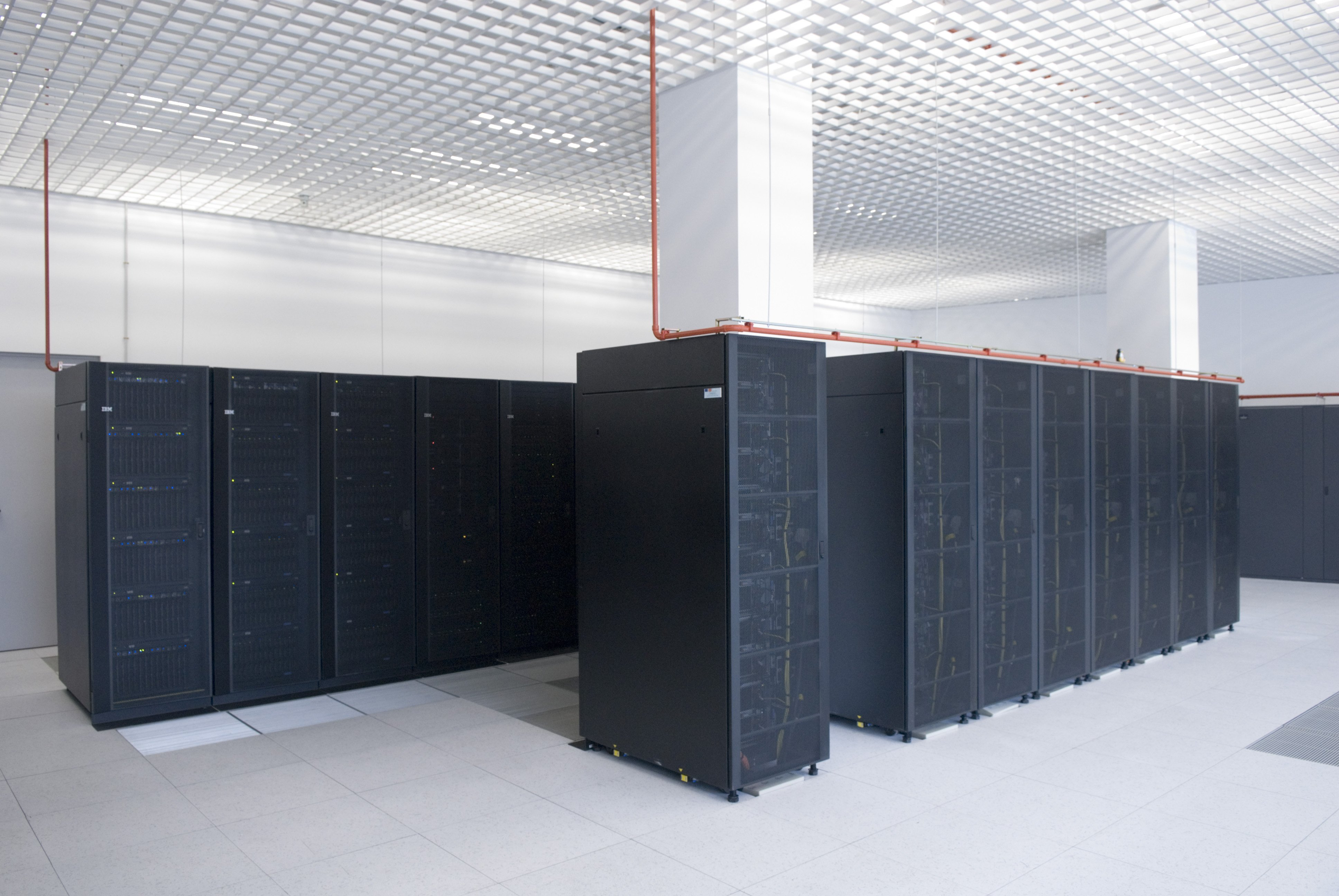
Magerit Supercomputer (CeSViMa-UPM)

The Spanish Supercomputing Network (RES) is a distributed infrastructure involving the interconnexion of 12 supercomputers which work together to offer High Performance Computing resources to the scientific community. It is coordinated by the Barcelona Supercomputing Center (BSC).

The RES is a Unique Scientific and Technical Infrastructure (ICTS) distributed throughout Spain.

Currently the RES is composed of 12 supercomputers located in different research centres and universities.

== History ==
The Spanish Supercomputing Network was created in March 2007 by the Spanish Ministry of Education and Science, in order to respond to the increasing needs of computing resources in Spain. To achieve this, MareNostrum supercomputer was upgraded and the old nodes from MareNostrum were used to create five new nodes (Altamira, CesarAugusta, LaPalma, Picasso, Tirant).

In 2009 Atlante supercomputer joined the network. The software of the supercomputers was upgraded to the same level.

In 2011 Magerit was upgraded and became the most powerful supercomputer in Spain and of this network.

In 2014 it opens in Tenerife, Teide-HPC supercomputer, which was at that time the second most powerful in Spain. Its calculation capacity is 10,000 office computers.

In 2015, 5 new nodes became part of the network: Finisterrae II at CESGA, Pirineus at Consorcio de Servicios Universitarios de Cataluña (CSUC), Lusitania at the Fundación Computación y Tecnologías Avanzadas de Extremadura, Caléndula at the Centro de Supercomputación de Castilla y León, and Cibeles at the Universidad Autónoma de Madrid In May 2016, Atlante supercomputer stopped its activity in the RES, and in December 2018 Magerit exit the RES. Currently, the network is composed of 11 institutions and 12 supercomputers.

== Use of the resources ==
All the supercomputing resources are aimed at non-profit R&D purposes. They are open to Spanish research groups from academia and public research centres. Research groups based in other countries can also apply for RES resources, but the participation of Spanish researchers is recommended.

Computing resources are granted by means of competitive calls. Proposals are evaluated every four months by the Access Committee, which is advised by an Expert Panel composed of prestigious scientists. The use of RES resources is allocated based on the criteria of excellence and scientific impact. Research groups do not need to pay for the use of RES resources.
