= Markram =

Markram is a surname. Notable people with the name include:

- Aiden Markram (born 1994), South African cricketer
- Henry Markram (born 1962), South African-born Israeli neuroscientist
- Robert Markram (1975–2001), South African rugby union player
