= Sukeforth =

Sukeforth is a surname. Notable people with the surname include:

- Clyde Sukeforth (1901–2000), American baseball player, coach, scout, and manager
- Gary Sukeforth (born 1960), American politician and businessman
