= MGT =

MGT or Mgt may refer to:

== Codes ==
- MGT, IATA airport code for Milingimbi Airport, an airport in Milingimbi Island, Northern Territory, Australia
- MGT, ISO 639-3 code for Mongol language (Papua New Guinea)

== Companies and organisations ==
- MGT Capital Investments, Inc., a cyber group founded by John McAfee
- Miles Gordon Technology, British technology company which produced ZX Spectrum add-ons
- Mitchell, Giurgola & Thorp, a 1980s Australian architectural firm
- Morgan Guaranty Trust Company, American company formed in 1959 following JP Morgan's purchase of the Guaranty Trust Company of New York

== Technology ==
- Master guide table, included in the Program and System Information Protocol used for providing electronic television programme guides
- Million Gross Tons, a unit for measuring a ship's internal volume overall in gross tonnage
- Mobile Global Title, address used in the SCCP protocol for routing signaling messages to mobile devices on telecommunications networks
- Multi-gigabit transceiver, serialiser/deserialiser capable of operating at serial bitrates above 1 gigabit/second

== Other uses ==
- Magnesium L-threonate, a dietary supplement in humans, intended to boost cognitive functioning
- Mark Thwaite, also known as MGT, English rock guitarist
- MGT: The Magnetik Tank, a Loriciels game
- Mongolia's Got Talent, a TV Series
- Muslim Girls Training, the all-female training program of the Nation of Islam

== See also ==
- Doctor of Management (D. Mgt.), academic degree awarded on the basis of advanced study and research in management
