= Sean Hill (scientist) =

American neuroscientist

- Born: Sean Lewis Hill; United States
- Education: Hampshire College, University of Lausanne
- Known for: AI-driven brain modeling, Large-scale computer models of brain circuits, simulations of different brain states (wakefulness, sleep, anesthesia, etc.), neuroinformatics, mental health, learning health systems
- Title: Professor
- Scientific career
- Fields: Neuroscience, Neuroinformatics, Computational Neuroscience
- Workplaces: University of Toronto, Centre for Addiction and Mental Health, International Neuroinformatics Coordinating Facility, Karolinska Institutet, École Polytechnique Fédérale de Lausanne, IBM Research, University of Wisconsin–Madison, The Neurosciences Institute, Senscience

Sean Lewis Hill is an American neuroscientist, Professor at the University of Toronto Faculty of Medicine, and co-founder and CEO of Senscience, an AI startup dedicated to transforming science with open data. He was previously the Inaugural Scientific Director of the Krembil Centre for Neuroinformatics in Toronto, Canada. Until December 2024, he also served as co-director of the Blue Brain Project at the École Polytechnique Fédérale de Lausanne located on the Campus Biotech in Geneva, Switzerland. Hill is known for pioneering work in AI-driven brain modeling and large-scale simulations of brain circuitry, with a focus on the biological basis of consciousness. His contributions also span neuroinformatics, open data infrastructure, and AI innovation in mental health.

== Early life and education ==
Hill was born in New Jersey, raised in Warren, Maine, and attended Camden-Rockport High School. He graduated from Hampshire College with a degree in Computational Neuroscience and obtained his PhD from the University of Lausanne, Switzerland.

== Career ==
After working with Nobel prize winner Gerald Edelman and Giulio Tononi at The Neurosciences Institute in San Diego, Hill continued his postdoctoral research at the University of Wisconsin–Madison. In 2006, Hill joined the Computational Biology group at the IBM Thomas J. Watson Research Center as Project Manager for Computational Neuroscience on the Blue Brain Project from 2006 to 2008. He subsequently joined the EPFL Blue Brain team. Hill served as the executive director of the International Neuroinformatics Coordinating Facility from 2011 to 2013 and as its Scientific Director from 2013 to 2016. He developed the core strategy and design of the neuroinformatics infrastructure of the EU Human Brain Project, led its development during its start-up phase, and in 2014 was co-director of the project.

In September 2017, Hill was named the inaugural Director of the Krembil Centre for Neuroinformatics at the Centre for Addiction and Mental Health in Toronto, Canada. The center applies machine learning and artificial intelligence techniques, as well as multi-scale modeling of the brain to understand mental health disorders. One initiative established under his tenure is the BrainHealth Databank, a data-driven learning health system integrating AI and computational models with mental health clinics.

Hill’s work at KCNI involved addressing questions about mental illnesses such as depression. He emphasizes the need for a multi-level biological understanding of mental illness and advocates for a collaborative, data-sharing approach to neuroscience.

Prior to this, Hill served as co-director of Blue Brain, where he led the Neuroinformatics Division. In this role, he pioneered the use of knowledge graphs for organizing neuroscience data, and directed the development of Blue Brain Nexus, an open-source data integration, management, and search platform adopted by both the Blue Brain Project and Human Brain Project.

Hill has developed several large-scale computational brain models and simulations, including the first large-scale model of the visual thalamocortical system of the cat, which accurately replicates multi-scale electrophysiological phenomena during wakefulness and sleep. He has also co-led Blue Brain's efforts to create digital reconstructions of neocortical and thalamic microcircuitry.

He is on the advisory or management boards of several clinical and neuroinformatics initiatives, including the Ontario Brain Institute, Brain Health Nexus, and others.

In 2022, Hill led a team at the Centre for Addiction and Mental Health to develop the Canadian Youth Mental Health Insight Platform, aimed at addressing longstanding gaps in youth mental health care. In 2024, Hill co-led an initiative to establish a pan-Canadian data federation for youth mental health.

Hill is the author of more than 100 peer-reviewed publications, holds multiple patents, and has given talks worldwide on neuroinformatics, mental health, brain modeling and simulation, and the cellular and synaptic mechanisms of conscious and unconscious brain states.

An advocate of global collaboration on data sharing in brain research, Hill has worked with brain projects worldwide to identify potential areas of collaboration and interaction. He has been quoted as saying, "It takes the world to understand the brain."

Hill has appeared in the press and in documentaries about the brain, including on ARTE and the PBS documentary The Brain with David Eagleman, and has been interviewed in print and on radio and television programs including the CBC, CNN, and Bloomberg.
