= Javier de Felipe =

Spanish biologist

- Born: Javier de Felipe Oroquieta; October 28, 1953 (age 72); Madrid, Spain
- Education: Complutense University of Madrid (BSc, PhD); Washington University School of Medicine (post-PhD); University of California, Irvine School of Medicine
- Occupations: biologist; researcher
- Known for: Blue Brain Project; Human Brain Project; Spike-timing-dependent plasticity

Academic background
- Doctoral advisor: Washington University School of Medicine

Academic work
- Discipline: Neuroscience
- Institutions: Technical University of Madrid
- Website: www.cajal.csic.es/departamentos/defelipe-oroquieta/datos.html

Javier de Felipe Oroquieta (born 1953, Madrid) is a research biologist specializing in the anatomical study of the human brain.

== Biography ==
De Felipe studied biology, graduated in 1975 and received his Ph.D. in 1979 from the Complutense University of Madrid. He completed his postdoctoral training from 1980 to 1983 at the Cajal Institute, with research on the cerebral cortex. He continued these investigations in the United States from 1983 at the Washington University School of Medicine, from 1984 to 1985 at the University of California, Irvine School of Medicine, where he continued between 1989 and 1991 as a Visiting scientist. Since 1991 he has been a research professor at the Cajal Institute of the Higher Council for Scientific Research. He is also director, at the Center for Biomedical Technology of the Technical University of Madrid, of the Cajal Laboratory of Cortical Circuits.

De Felipe returned to the Cajal Institute in 1991 and formed a research team to analyze alterations in the cerebral cortex in patients with epilepsy. In 1997 he participated in NASA's Neurolab project to study the impact of space flight on neural circuits in the brain. Since 2006 he began researching the effects of Alzheimer's disease on the microstructure and micro-organization of the cerebral cortex.

De Felipe has participated in the Blue Brain Project since it began in 2005, led by Professor Henry Markram. The Blue Brain project became an international initiative, in which Spain participates with the Cajal Blue Brain project led by De Felipe. The Blue Brain project has served as the basis for proposing the global project called the Human Brain Project of the European Commission, started in October 2013, with the participation of laboratories and institutions from all over the world. De Felipe is co-director, together with Professor Seth Grant, of the Molecular and Cellular neuroscience division.

De Felipe has received awards and recognitions such as the Krieg Cortical Kudos Award from the Cajal Club (United States) in 1999 for his work on the cerebral cortex, the Chair Santiago Ramón y Cajal award from the Academy of Sciences of Mexico that he received in 2005, or the appointment in 2013 of Honorary Member of the American Association for Anatomy for his research on anatomical sciences.

== Selected works ==
- 2009 Cajal's Butterflies of the Soul: Science and Art. ISBN 978-0195392708.
- 2014 The Garden of Neurology: about beauty, art and the brain. ISBN 9788434021563.
- 2017 Cajal's Neuronal Forest: Science and Art. ISBN 978-0190842833.
- 2022 From Laetoli to the Moon. The unusual journey of the human brain. ISBN 978-84-9199-426-8.

== Awards and achievements ==
- 1999 The Cortical Discoverer Award: Javier De Felipe. Cerebral Cortex, Volume 9, Issue 5, July 1999, Pages 519–520.

== See also ==
- Blue Brain Project
- Henry Markram
- Seth Grant
