= Project Joshua Blue =

Joshua Blue is a project under development by IBM that focuses on advancing the artificial intelligence field by designing and programming computers to emulate human mental functions.

== Goals ==
According to researchers at IBM's Thomas J. Watson Research Center, the main goal of Joshua Blue is "to achieve cognitive flexibility that approaches human functioning". In short, IBM is aiming to design Joshua Blue to 'think like a human', mainly in terms of emotional thought.

== How it will work ==
A model of Joshua Blue's learning pattern has been created. Similar to how young children learn human traits through interacting with their surroundings, Joshua Blue will acquire knowledge through external stimuli present in its environment. IBM believes that if computers evolve to learn in this way and then comprehend and analyze the knowledge gained using reason, computers could begin to possess a "mind", of sorts, capable of demonstrating complex social behaviors similar to those of humans.

Thus far, IBM has revealed that Joshua Blue will be a computer with a network of wires and input nodes that function as a computer nervous system. This nervous system will be used by Joshua Blue to perceive affect or personal emotional feelings. Not only will this network of input nodes help Joshua Blue discover things physically, but it will also allow Joshua Blue to interpret the significance of events. The input nodes, or proprioceptors, will enable Joshua Blue to be aware of things that happen around itself, as well as recognize and attach meaning to the emotional effect produced by interacting with an object in a certain way. In addition, Joshua Blue's proprioceptors will function as pain and pleasure sensors, allowing Joshua Blue to employ a similar "reward and punishment" system that humans use to form behaviors.

== See also ==
- Blue Brain Project
- Simulated reality
