= FinisTerrae =

Supercomputer

Finisterrae II
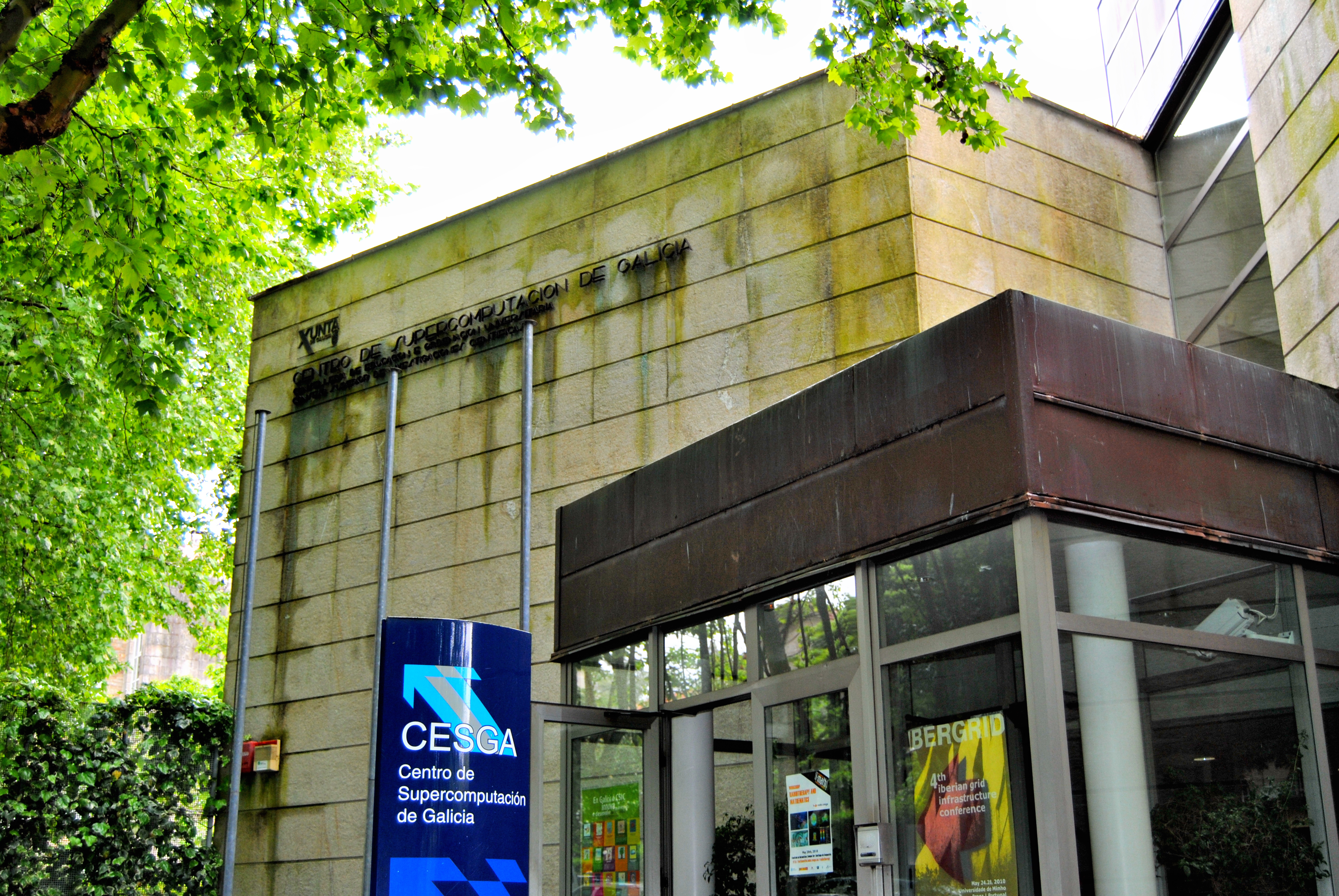
- Location: CESGA; Santiago de Compostela (Galicia); Spain
- Operating system: SUSE Linux
- Memory: 44,800 GB
- Speed: 328 TFlops
- Ranking: TOP500: 100, nov 2007
- Website: cesga.es

Finisterrae was the 100th supercomputer in Top500 ranking in November 2007. Running at 12.97 teraFLOPS, it would rank at position 258 on the list as of June 2008. It is also the third most powerful supercomputer in Spain (after MareNostrum and Magerit). It was located in Galicia.

This project was promoted by the Xunta de Galicia (regional government of Galicia) and the Spanish National Research Council (CSIC). It was founded in 1993, its goal was to serve as a platform to foster scientific innovation and invest in Research and Development.

The supercomputer was physically hosted at CESGA, the Galician Supercomputing Center. CESGA is a public consortium founded in 1991 and located in Santiago de Compostela, Galicia, Spain.

CESGA provides a range of supercomputing services to researchers and technologists. These services include expert advice on algorithm selection and development, code porting and optimization for high-performance computing, cloud computing resources, and remote visualization tools. CESGA's services are available to researchers from Galician universities, CSIC centers, and public and private research and development departments. Typical users include those working with supercomputers, workstations, or PC networks for complex calculations.

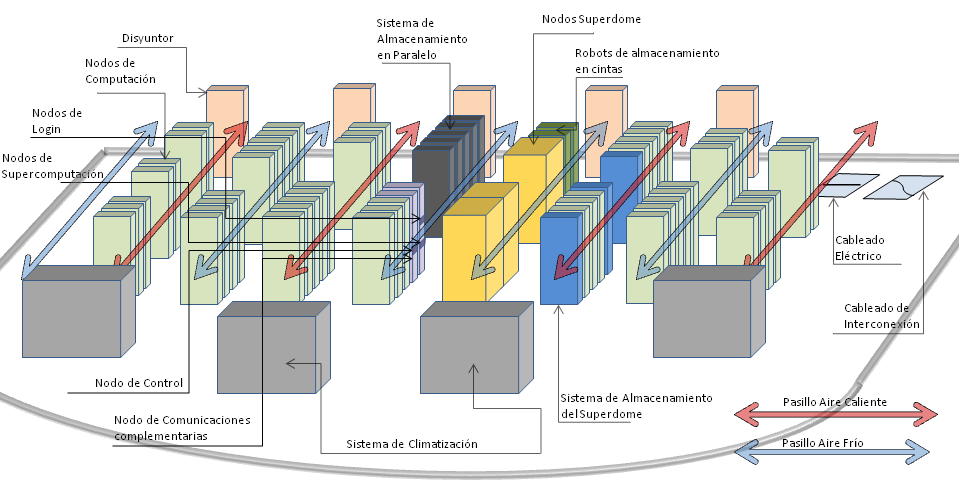
FinisTerrae I distribution diagram

== Overview ==
The main Finisterrae characteristics are depicted on the following table:

Name	Year	OS	Architecture	Processors	Memory (TB)	Power (TFlops)	Top500 Ranking
Finisterrae I	2007	Linux	Itanium 2 64 (Intel)	2400	19,5	12,9	100 (nov 2007)
Finisterrae II	2015	Linux	Haswell 64 (Intel)	7712 cores	44,8	328	
Finisterrae III	2021	Linux				1968 approx.	

One of the special characteristics about FinisTerrae I supercomputer is the ratio between cores and RAM. This was one reason that it received the denomination of "singular technical and scientific installation" from the Spanish government, a denomination given to some installations which have some value that makes them singular in some way. Some of those installations include the Canary Island grand telescope, or the Alba synchrotron.

Even if this is the third fastest supercomputer in Spain, some projects that require special amounts of memory cannot be held by the first or second supercomputer, and therefore must be executed on the Finisterrae.

== Architecture ==
=== FinisTerrae I ===
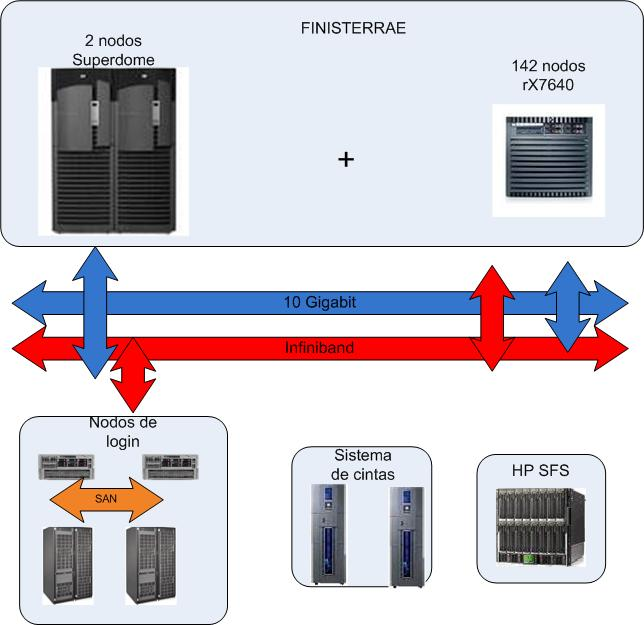
FinisTerrae I architecture

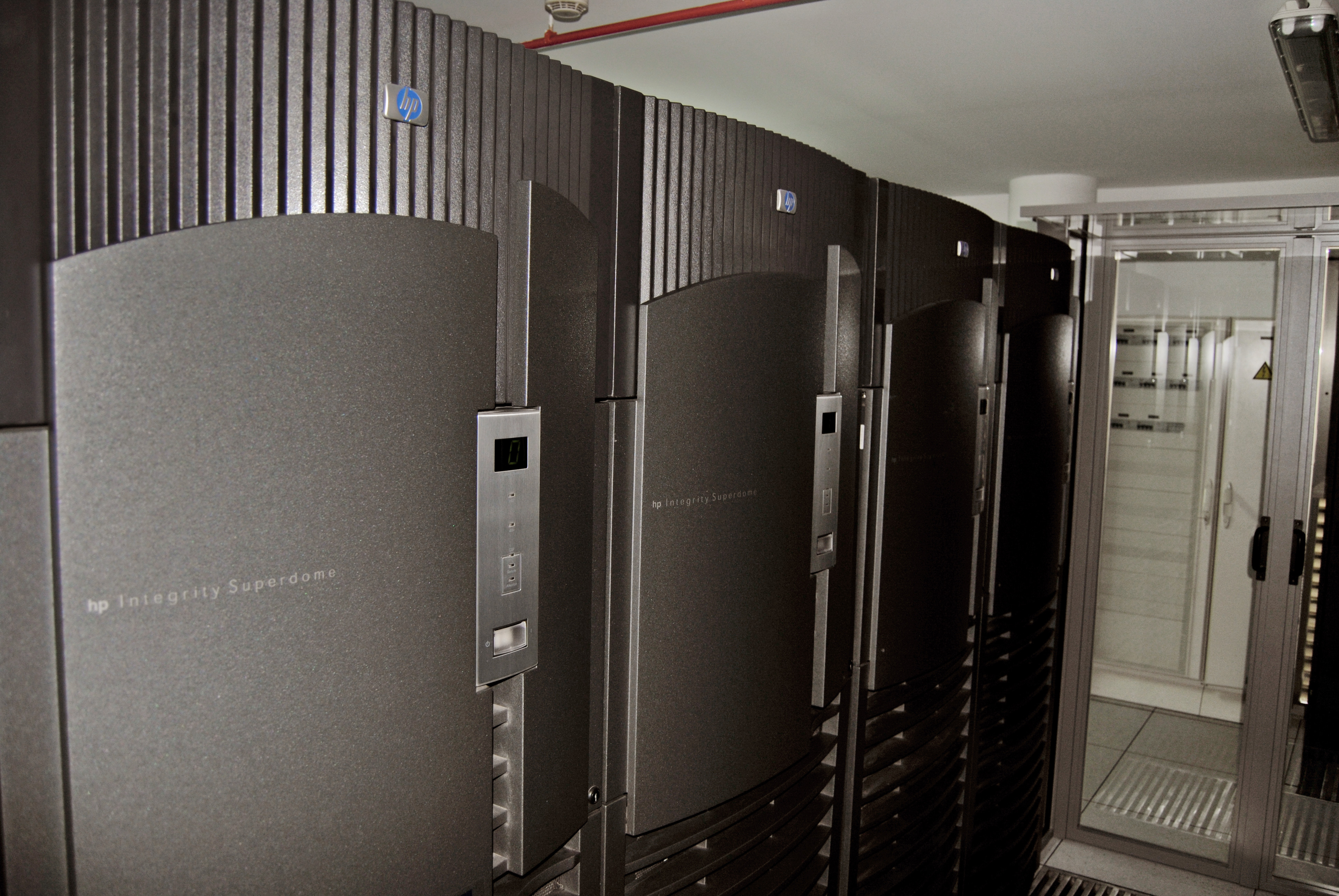
HP Integrity Superdome nodes (Finisterrae I)

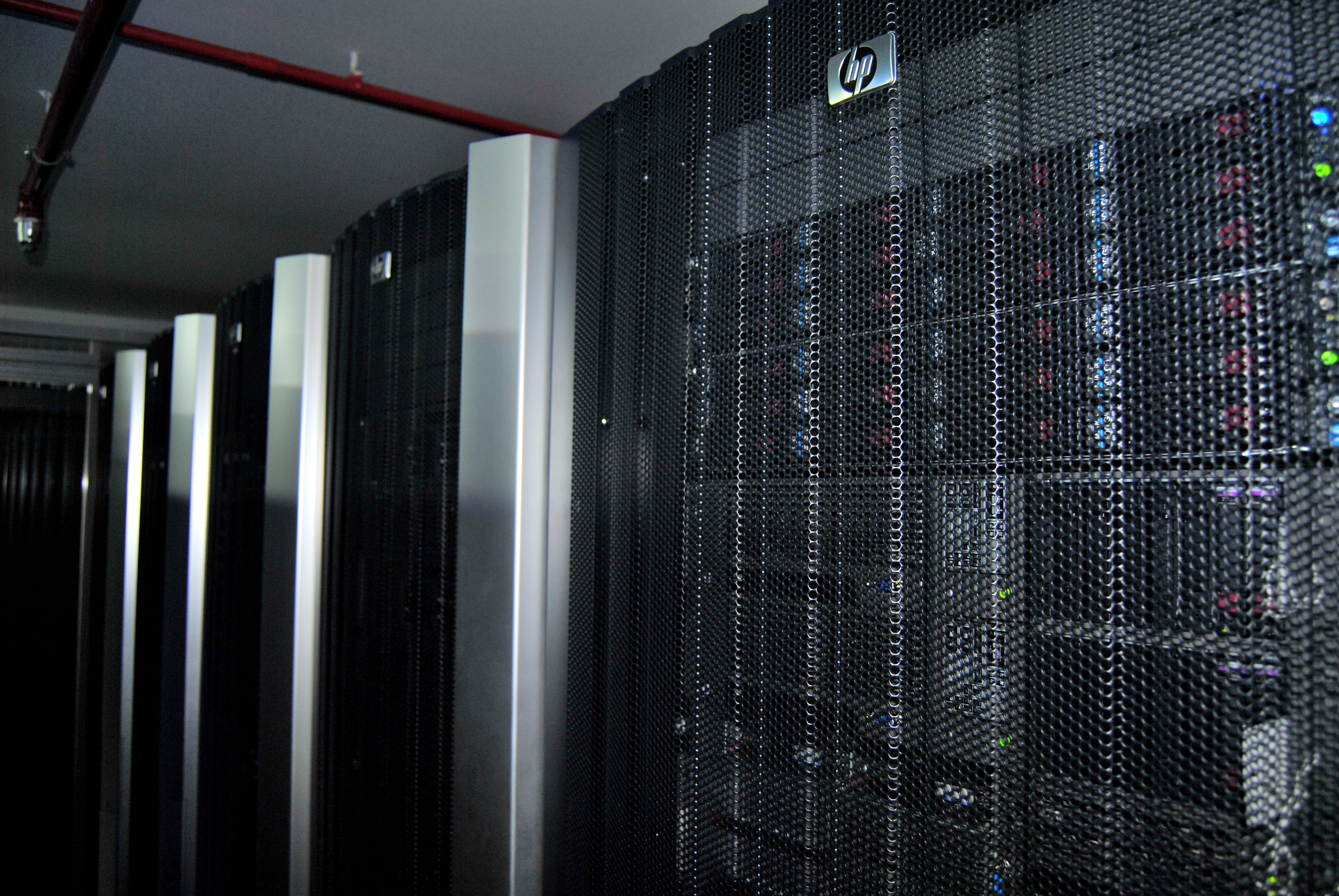
HP-SFS storage system nodes (Finisterrae I)

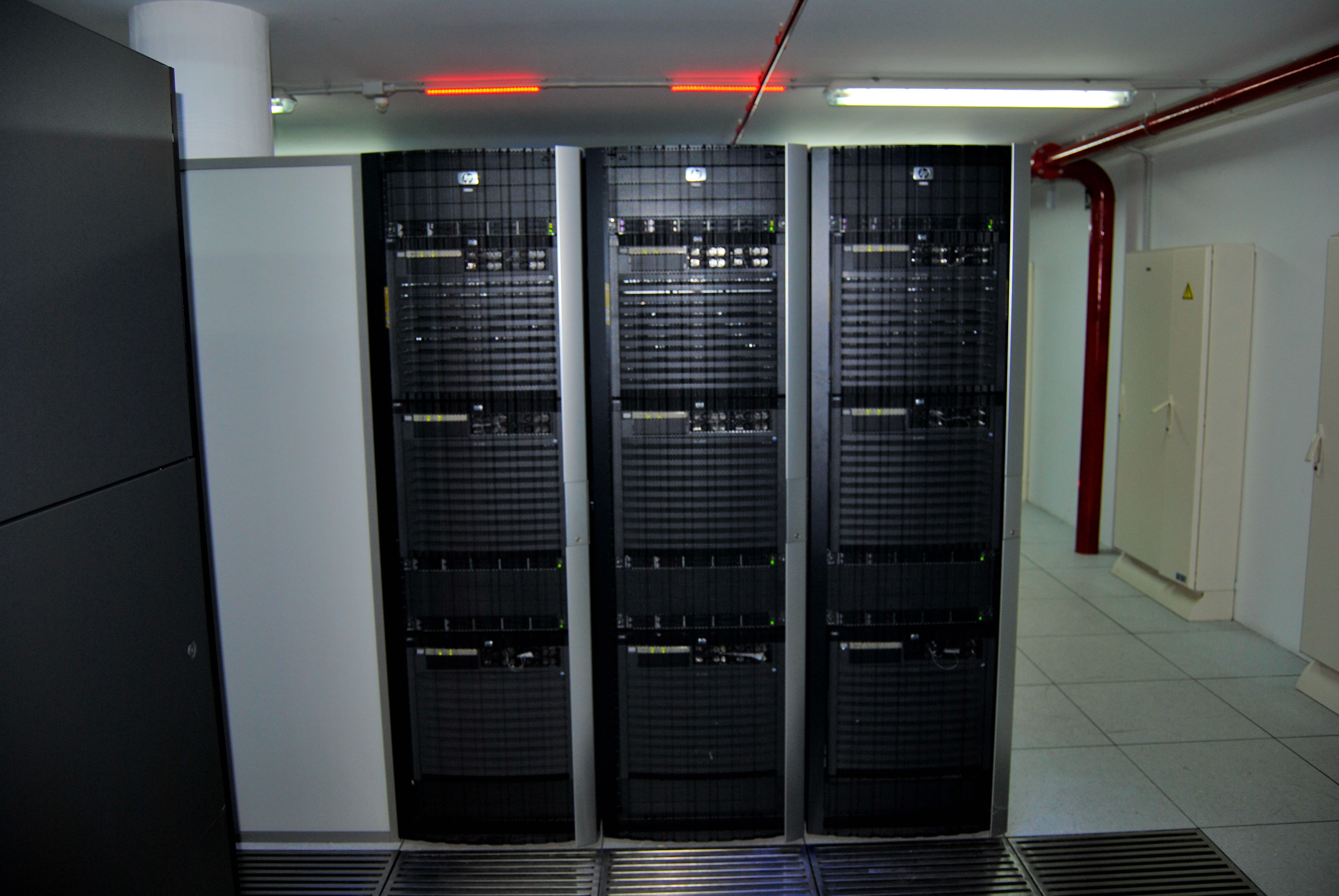
HP Integrity RX7640 nodes (Finisterrae I)

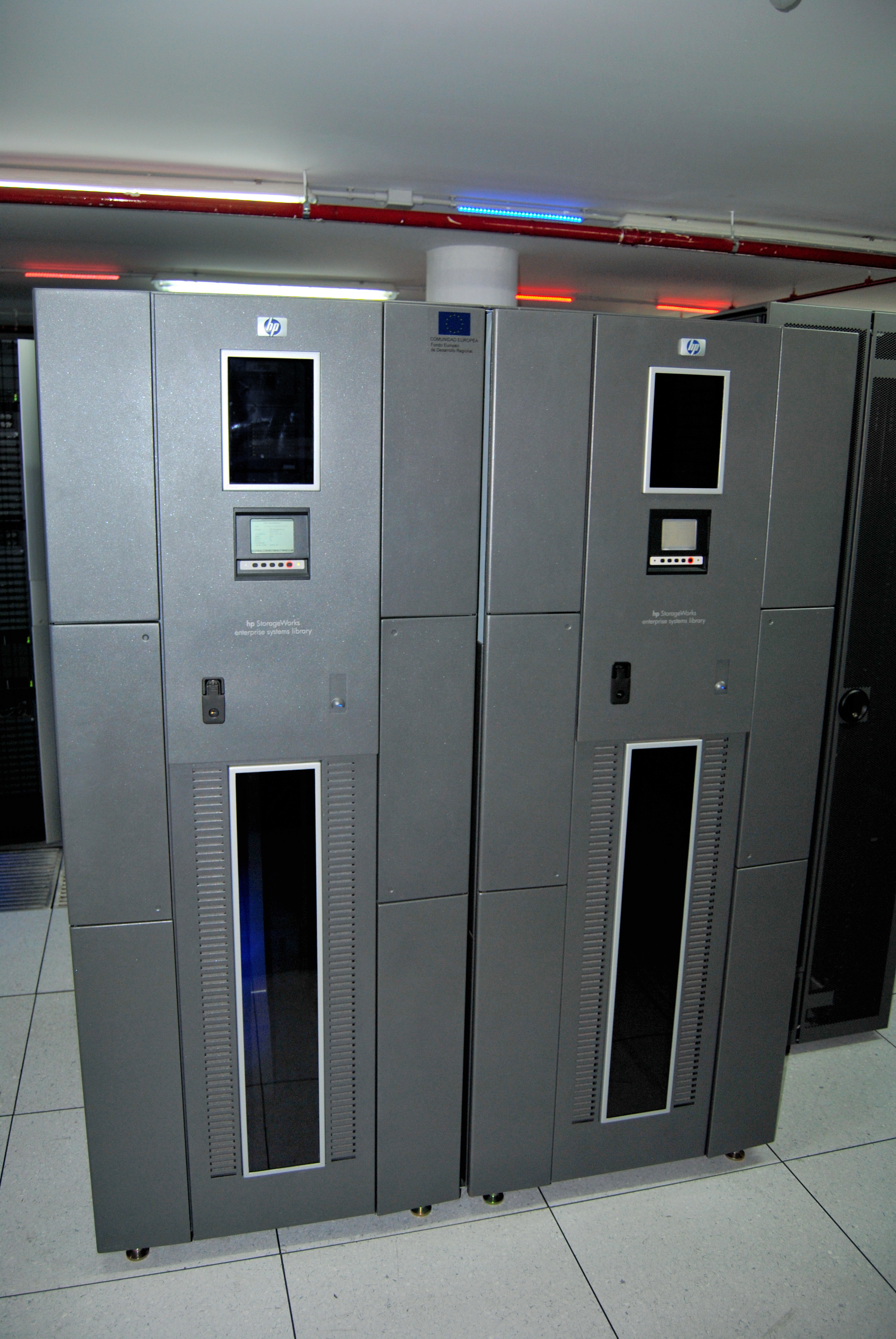
HP ESL 712e tape library (Finisterrae I)

FinisTerrae supercomputer, located in CESGA is an integrated system by shared-memory nodes with and SMP NUMA architecture.

FinisTerrae is composed of 144 computational nodes:

- 142 hp (106 kW) HP Integrity rx7640 nodes with 16 Itanium Montvale cores and 128 GB memory each one
- 1 hp (0.75 kW) Integrity Superdome node, with 128 Itanium Montvale cores and 1024 GB memory
- 1 hp (0.75 kW) Integrity Superdome node, with 128 Itanium 2 cores and 384 GB memory

A hierarchic storing system with:

- 22 nodes for storing management with 96 processing cores
- The storage is connected to 72 cabins connected to 864 SATA disks, managed by Lustre. Backups are stored on tapes which provide 2.200.000 GB.
- An interconnecting network between Infiniband 4x DDR at 20 Gbit/s nodes, providing 16 Gbit/s of effective bandwidth
- An external management Gigabit Ethernet network
- The nodes user SUSE Linux Enterprise Server as the operating system. This operating system helped save an important amount of money when compared to other non-free options.
- FinisTerrae includes open software and standard like Linux, Lustre, Grid Engine and Globus.
- System also has next compilators, libraries and development tools: Intel C/C and Fortran, Intel MKL, Vtune, HP-MPI and HP UPC.

== Projects ==
As main purpose, the aim of the supercomputer is research. The supercomputer is mainly used by the three universities located in Galicia, (Universidade da Coruña, Universidade de Santiago de Compostela and Universidade de Vigo), as well as other research organizations like CSIC. The main projects held by the supercomputer are divided into four fields:

- Life sciences
- Nanotechnology
- Sea sciences
- Renewable energies
