= Supercomputing and Visualization Center of Madrid =

Supercomputer site in Madrid, Spain

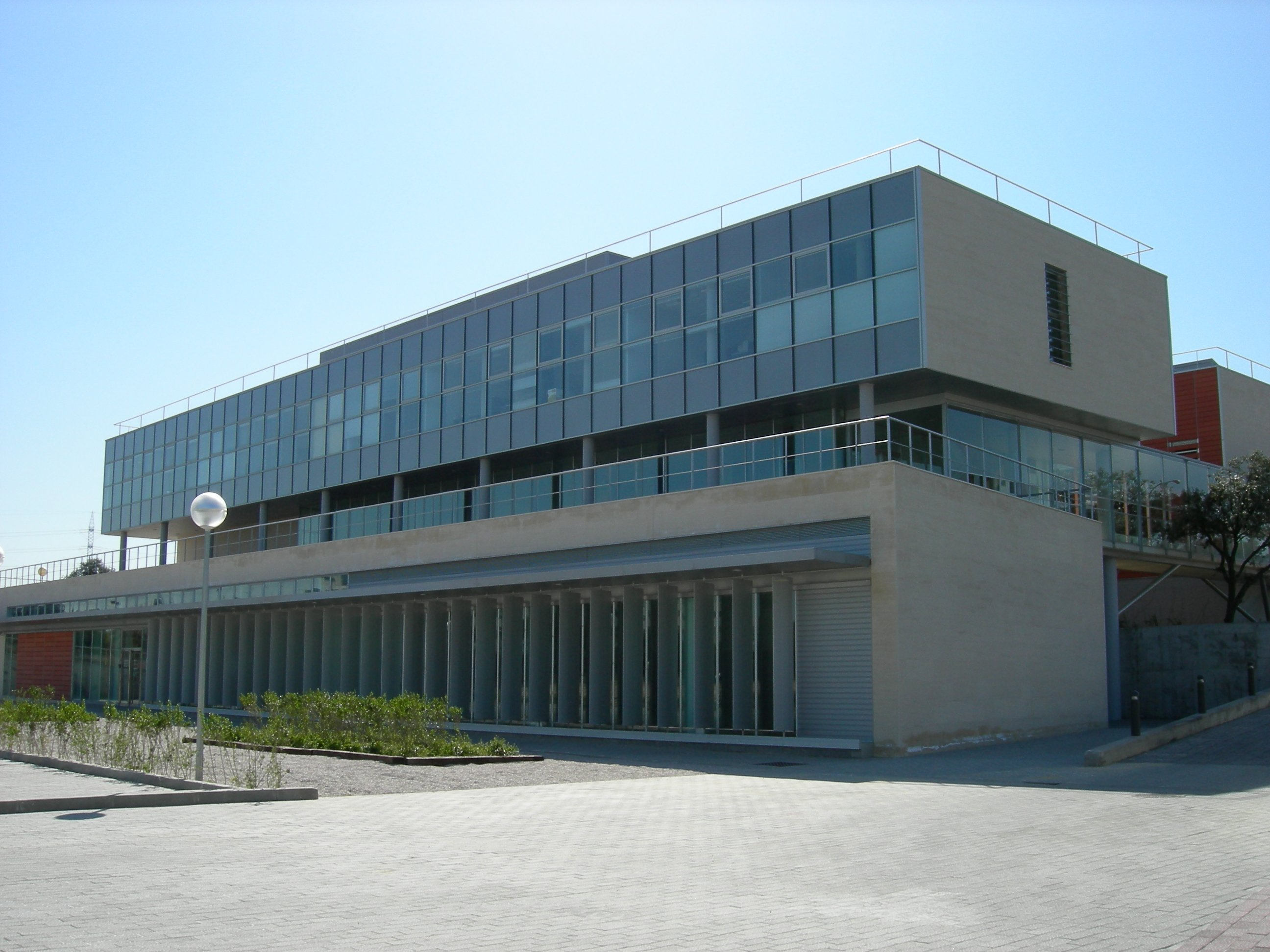
CeSViMa Building

The Supercomputing and Visualization Center of Madrid (CeSViMa), also called Madrid Supercomputing and Visualization Center (in Spanish, Centro de Supercomputación y Visualización de Madrid), depends on the computer science faculty of the Technical University of Madrid. This center houses Magerit, one of the most powerful supercomputers in Spain. This center is a member of the Spanish Supercomputing Network, the Spanish e-Science Network and the Madrid Laboratories and Infraestructures Network.

== History ==
In 2004, CeSViMa was created by the Technical University of Madrid and CIEMAT. The aim of the center is to provide computation resources to the researchers of Madrid. IBM provided the supercomputer Magerit in the center. The center also has an interactive 3D visualization infrastructure and a terrestrial scanner.

In 2007, CeSViMa joined the Spanish Supercomputing Network and the supercomputer Magerit was upgraded.

In May 2008, the center migrated all its infrastructure to a new building in the newly created in the International Excellence Campus of Montegancedo, site of Scientific and Technologic Park of the Technical University of Madrid (40°24′15.65″N 03°50′4.75″W). The supercomputer was upgraded again and reach 16 TFLOPS. 60% of the supercomputer CPU time is used for RES research; the remaining 40% is used for Madrid research.

During 2009, the center joined the Spanish e-Science Network and the Madrid Laboratories and Infrastructures Network.

In 2011, a full upgrade of Magerit supercomputer put it as the most powerful and ecological supercomputer of Spain in the July editions of TOP500 and Green500 lists used as reference in this matter (positions 136 and 18)

== Research ==
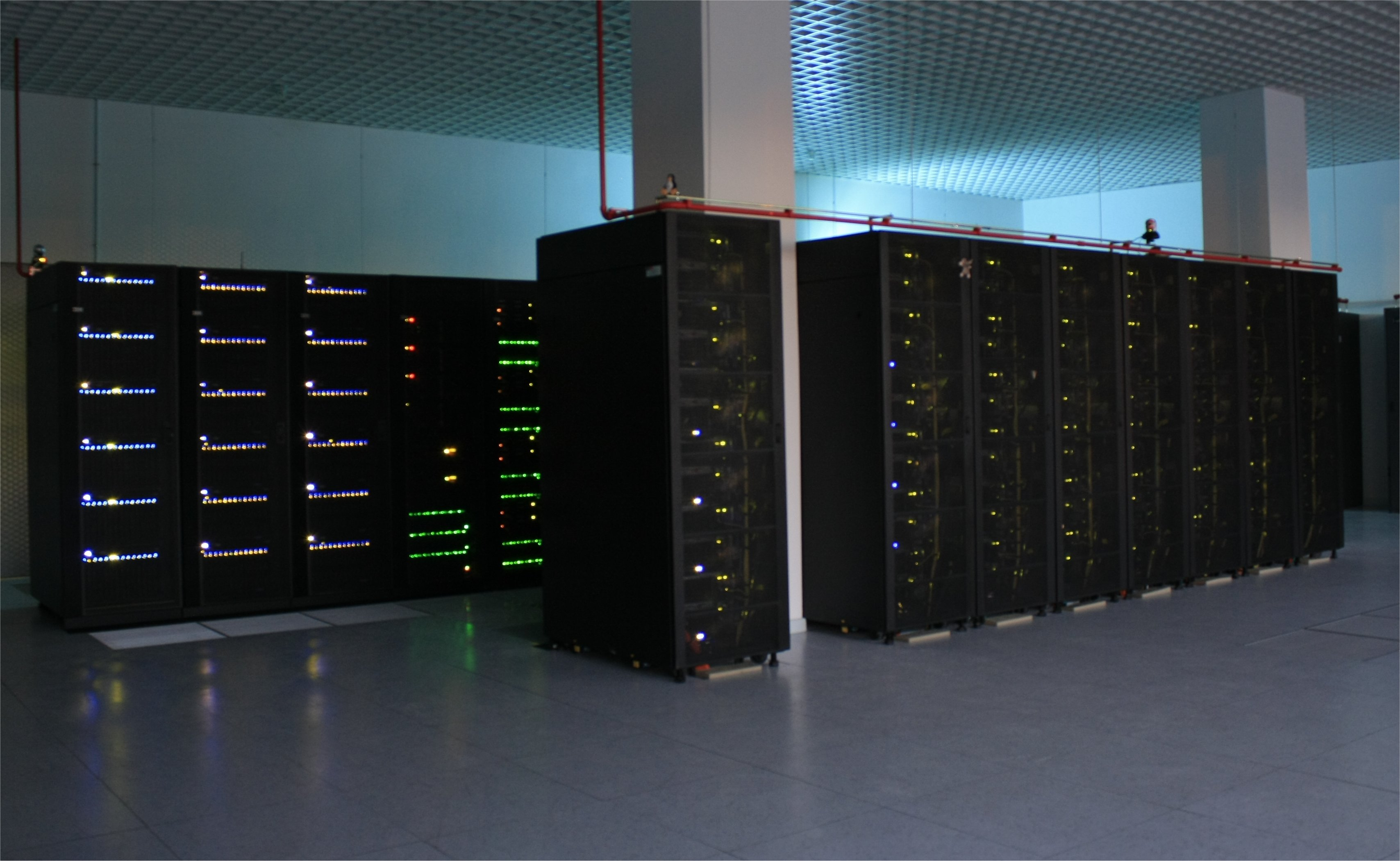
Magerit Supercomputer hosted by CeSViMa

The Spanish branch of the international project Blue Brain (called Cajal Blue Brain) is carrying out in the facilities of the CeSViMa. The project also uses the computing resources of Magerit supercomputer

The center also organizes conferences about supercomputing, new developments in hardware and software, scientific publications... and other science activities. For example, it collaborates in the retransmission of a Solar eclipse from Novosibirsk, Russia.
