= Seth Grant =

Australian neuroscientist

- Born: Sydney, Australia
- Education: Sydney University
- Scientific career
- Fields: Neuroscience
- Institutions: University of Edinburgh
- Academic advisors: Eric Kandel

Seth Grant FMedSci is an Australian neuroscientist and Professor of Molecular Neuroscience at the University of Edinburgh in Scotland. He previously worked as a principal investigator at the Wellcome Trust Sanger Institute in Cambridge, England. He is known for his research on the biological basis of brain diseases. He was elected a fellow of the Academy of Medical Sciences in 2015. He is also an elected Fellow of the Royal Society of Edinburgh.

== See also ==
- Human Brain Project
- Javier de Felipe
