= Appleton, Maine =

Town in Maine, United States

- Town
- Location in Knox County and the state of Maine.
- Coordinates: 44°16′42″N 69°14′17″W
- Country: United States
- State: Maine
- County: Knox
- Villages: Appleton; Burkettville; North Appleton

Government
  - Type: Town Meeting-Select board

Area
  - Total: 33.43 sq mi (86.58 km^{2})
  - Land: 32.71 sq mi (84.72 km^{2})
  - Water: 0.72 sq mi (1.86 km^{2})
- Elevation: 423 ft (129 m)

Population (2020)
  - Total: 1,411
  - Density: 43/sq mi (16.7/km^{2})
- Time zone: UTC-5 (Eastern (EST))
  - Summer (DST): UTC-4 (EDT)
- ZIP code: 04862
- Area code: 207
- FIPS code: 23-01465
- GNIS feature ID: 582327
- Website: appleton.maine.gov

Appleton is a town in Knox County, Maine, United States. It is about 15 miles inland from Penobscot Bay and coastal towns such as Camden and Rockland, about 30 miles east of the state capital of Augusta. The population was 1,411 at the 2020 census.

== History ==
The town was incorporated on January 28, 1829, from the former Plantation of Appleton. The plantation and town was named for Nathaniel Appleton, who was for more than 20 years an officer of the Twenty Associates, the proprietors of Appleton, as well as Camden, Hope, Liberty, and Montville.

== Geography ==
According to the United States Census Bureau, the town has a total area of 33.43 square miles (86.58 km^{2}), of which 32.71 square miles (84.72 km^{2}) is land and 0.72 square miles (1.86 km^{2}) is water.

== Demographics ==
Historical population
Census	Pop.	Note	%±
1840	891		—
1850	1,727		93.8%
1860	1,573		−8.9%
1870	1,485		−5.6%
1880	1,348		−9.2%
1890	1,080		−19.9%
1900	975		−9.7%
1910	842		−13.6%
1920	683		−18.9%
1930	574		−16.0%
1940	641		11.7%
1950	671		4.7%
1960	672		0.1%
1970	628		−6.5%
1980	818		30.3%
1990	1,069		30.7%
2000	1,271		18.9%
2010	1,316		3.5%
2020	1,411		7.2%
U.S. Decennial Census

=== 2010 census ===
As of the census of 2010, there were 1,316 people, 545 households, and 362 families living in the town. The population density was 40.2 inhabitants per square mile (15.5/km^{2}). There were 646 housing units at an average density of 19.7 per square mile (7.6/km^{2}). The racial makeup of the town was 97.8% White, 0.5% African American, 0.2% Asian, 0.2% from other races, and 1.3% from two or more races. Hispanic or Latino of any race were 0.6% of the population.

There were 545 households, of which 30.6% had children under the age of 18 living with them, 56.9% were married couples living together, 5.7% had a female householder with no husband present, 3.9% had a male householder with no wife present, and 33.6% were non-families. 27.2% of all households were made up of individuals, and 9% had someone living alone who was 65 years of age or older. The average household size was 2.41 and the average family size was 2.95.

The median age in the town was 43 years. 23.2% of residents were under the age of 18; 5.6% were between the ages of 18 and 24; 24.3% were from 25 to 44; 34.8% were from 45 to 64; and 12.1% were 65 years of age or older. The gender makeup of the town was 51.7% male and 48.3% female.

=== 2000 census ===
As of the census of 2000, there were 1,271 people, 480 households, and 346 families living in the town. The population density was 38.8 inhabitants per square mile (15.0/km^{2}). There were 547 housing units at an average density of 16.7 per square mile (6.4/km^{2}). The racial makeup of the town was 98.51% White, 0.39% African American, 0.08% from other races, and 1.02% from two or more races. Hispanic or Latino of any race were 0.63% of the population.

There were 480 households, out of which 39.6% had children under the age of 18 living with them, 62.3% were married couples living together, 6.0% had a female householder with no husband present, and 27.9% were non-families. 21.7% of all households were made up of individuals, and 7.5% had someone living alone who was 65 years of age or older. The average household size was 2.65 and the average family size was 3.13.

In the town, the population was spread out, with 29.3% under the age of 18, 5.0% from 18 to 24, 32.7% from 25 to 44, 22.8% from 45 to 64, and 10.1% who were 65 years of age or older. The median age was 36 years. For every 100 females, there were 98.6 males. For every 100 females age 18 and over, there were 96.3 males.

The median income for a household in the town was $36,615, and the median income for a family was $41,731. Males had a median income of $27,065 versus $25,385 for females. The per capita income for the town was $16,484. About 4.6% of families and 7.9% of the population were below the poverty line, including 8.4% of those under age 18 and 9.8% of those age 65 or over.

== Education ==
Public schools:

- Appleton Village School (K–8), School Union 69
- Camden Hills Regional High School

== Notable people ==
- Barbara Merrill, Democrat-turned unenrolled state legislator who ran for governor in 2006
- Jonathan Richman, singer, songwriter and guitarist
- Gary Sukeforth, unenrolled state legislator and grocery store owner
