= Camden Hills Regional High School =

Location
- 25 Keelson Dr. Rockport, Maine; United States; 44°11′19″N 69°06′02″W

Information
- Type: Public High School
- Established: 1999
- School district: Five Town Community School District
- Principal: Jen Curtis
- Officer in charge: Harrison Rogers
- Faculty: 110
- Teaching staff: 60.20 (FTE)
- Enrollment: 757 (2024–2025)
- Student to teacher ratio: 12.57
- Colors: Red and White
- Mascot: Captain Jammer
- Nickname: Windjammers
- Website: https://chrhs.fivetowns.net/

Camden Hills Regional High School (CHRHS) is a public high school in Rockport, Maine, United States. It serves as the sole public high school of the Five Town Community School District, which encompasses the towns of Camden, Rockport, Lincolnville, Hope, and Appleton. The school's athletic teams compete as the Windjammers.

== History ==
Camden Hills Regional High School was established in 1999 as part of Maine's regional school consolidation efforts that gained momentum during the 1950s and 1960s. The formation of the Five Town Community School District consolidated secondary education services for the five participating municipalities, following Maine's Community School District Act of 1947, which encouraged regional cooperation to provide more comprehensive educational programs.

The school was constructed on a campus at 25 Keelson Drive in Rockport, located to serve students from all five participating towns. The building has undergone various maintenance and upgrade projects since its construction.

== Campus and facilities ==
The school operates from a facility designed to accommodate approximately 750 students. The campus includes academic classrooms, science laboratories, computer facilities, a library, gymnasium, auditorium, and athletic fields. The school has experienced infrastructure maintenance needs related to its geothermal heating and cooling system, exterior siding, and windows.

The school's main athletic facility is Don Palmer Field, which serves multiple sports programs. The Strom Auditorium hosts performances, assemblies, and community events.

== Students and enrollment ==
Camden Hills Regional High School serves students in grades 9–12, with an enrollment of 745 students as of the 2023-2024 school year. The school maintains a student-teacher ratio of 12.74:1. Students come from the five member towns of the Community School District, with the school also accepting tuition-paying students from neighboring communities.

Student demographics include approximately 5% minority enrollment and 20% economically disadvantaged students.

Students typically arrive from feeder schools including Appleton Village School, Camden-Rockport Middle School, Hope Elementary School, and Lincolnville Central School. These elementary and middle schools are part of Maine School Administrative District 28 and School Union 69.

== Academics ==
Camden Hills Regional High School offers a curriculum including English, Social Studies, Mathematics, Science, Health, and Physical Education. Additional programs include Visual Arts, Personal Finance, Computer Science, and world languages including French, Spanish, and Latin.

The school provides technical education courses through partnerships with the Mid-Coast School of Technology. Advanced Placement classes are available, and the school operates a school-to-career program for juniors and seniors.

According to school data, 22% of teachers hold National Board Certification. The school has produced National Merit Semi-Finalists.

=== Performance and rankings ===
Camden Hills Regional High School ranks 12th among Maine's public high schools according to some ranking systems. The Five Town Community School District ranks within the top 20% of Maine's 191 school districts based on mathematics and reading proficiency testing data.

The school received College Success Awards in 2022 and 2024.

== Athletics ==
The school's athletic teams compete as the "Windjammers" with Captain Jammer as the mascot. Camden Hills participates in the Maine Principals' Association and offers sports programs including football, basketball, soccer, baseball, softball, track and field, and swimming.

According to school reports, more than half of Camden Hills students participate in athletics.

=== Championships and achievements ===
The girls' soccer program won four consecutive Class A state championships from 2016-2019. Kristina Kelly, who played during this period, was named National Player of the Year for high school girls by the United Soccer Coaches organization in 2019. Kelly's career statistics included 159 goals and 58 assists.

In 2025, Colby Bennett received Gatorade Maine Boys Soccer Player of the Year honors after the Windjammers won the Class A state championship.

The school operates a cycling program that competes in mountain bike racing events in New England.

== Recent developments ==
=== Teacher housing project ===
In 2024, the school district proposed converting the historic Elm Street School building in Camden into apartments for new teachers to address teacher recruitment challenges related to housing availability.

The Camden Planning Board approved necessary zoning changes in February 2024. However, the district announced in March 2025 that it would not proceed with the project due to higher than expected renovation costs.

=== Facility issues ===
In January 2025, the school addressed a bed bug issue through inspection and pest control measures, with the problem contained to two conference rooms.

The school district has proposed infrastructure improvements through bond measures, including HVAC system repairs, building envelope improvements, athletic field upgrades, and auditorium renovations.

== Notable alumni ==
- Tim Boetsch – mixed martial arts fighter
- Nathaniel Butler Jr. – former president of Colby College
- Anna Goodale – Olympic gold medalist in rowing (2008)
- Sean Hill – neuroscientist
- Gary Sukeforth – politician and businessperson
- Molly White – Wikipedia editor and writer
