= CESGA =

Spanish high performance computing center

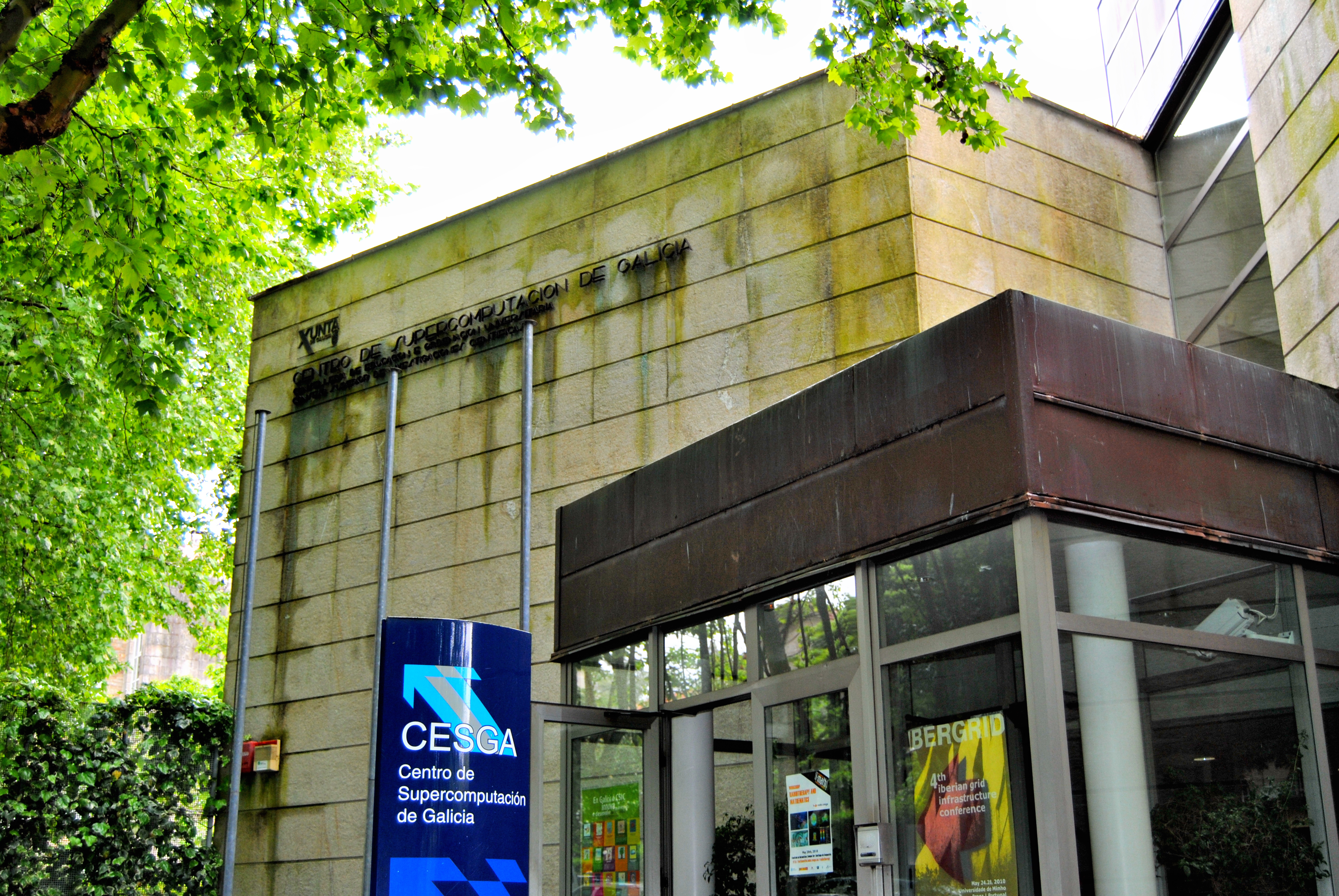
- Location(s): CESGA; Santiago de Compostela (A Coruña); Spain
- Coordinates: 42°52′32″N 8°33′12″W
- Staff: 45
- Website: cesga.es

Centro de Supercomputación de Galicia (CESGA) is a high performance computing center in Galicia (Spain). Its most important features are the supercomputer FinisTerrae and the "Superordenador Virtual Gallego". Finisterrae is nowadays the third most powerful supercomputer in Spain, and it was initially ranked 100th according to the Top500 when installed in November 2007. CESGA provides advanced computing services to the Galician Scientific Community, Galician Universities and to the Spanish National Research Council (Consejo Superior de Investigaciones Científicas - CSIC).

CESGA also runs i-math, a Grid computing project with an initiative to approach Grid technologies to mathematics researchers, and operates the i-math Portal, a Grid Portal based on P-GRADE Portal technology. (See also: Grid computing)

== Most important functions ==
- To promote and spread the use of technologies of high performance computing and advanced communications. One of this examples is GalNIX, a neutral point of Internet traffic interchange for Galicia. The aim of GalNIX is to facilitate the data interchange between the Internet Service Providers which operate inside the Galician region. Some of the companies included here are Jazztel, "R cable y telecomunicaciones", Retegal and Retevisión.
- To promote and spread the use of technologies related to the Information Society, including: electronic commerce, e-learning and geographical information systems.

== Computer Systems ==
The following table shows some of the systems installed in CESGA. Since some systems were installed around 10 years ago some information may be outdated.

Computer system	Description	Installation date	Decommission date
Compaq HPC 320	Consists of a cluster of 8 servers hosting 32 Alpha EV68 1 GHz processors	2002	
Cluster Beowulf	A cluster consisting of 17 Pentium III 1,13 GHz processors. The nodes are interconnected using a Myrinet network.	2002	
CESGA CrossGrid Node	Consists of a cluster of 20 Intel Pentium III 1,13 processors interconnected using a Gigabit network	2002	
SVG	The "Supercomputador Virtual Gallego" consists of 54 Intel Pentium III processors from 550 MHz up to 1 GHz interconnected through Myrinet and Fast Ethernet networks.	2000 (first phase)	
CheapTB	Consists of 1 Intel Pentium III 1,2 GHz and 4 Pentium IV 2 GHz processors interconnected by a Myrinet network. The storage is made using 32x180 GB disks.	2003	
Storagetek 9710	It is a tape storage system consisting of 195x220 GB and 375x80 GB cartridges	1999	
HP Integrity Rx5670	Consists of 4 Intel Itanium2 processors interconnected using Fibre Channel.	2004	
Storage array EVA 3000	Consists of 112x146 Fibre Channel disks configured in a RAID 5 system.	2003	
Sun Microsystems HPC 4500	12 x UltraSPARC II 400 MHz processors	1999	
Sun Enterprise 3500	4 x 400 MHz UltraSPARC II interconnected using an Ethernet -Gigabit connection	1999	
HP Cluster Superdome	Consists of 2 SMP nodes which host 128 Intel Itanium2 1500 MHz processors. The connection is made using an Infiniband network.	2003	
FinisTerrae I			
FinisTerrae II			
FinisTerrae III	354 nodes and 708 processors (Intel Xeon Ice Lake 8352Y, 32 cores at 2.2 GHz). 80 of these nodes, integrate 144 GPU math accelerators, reaching 4 PetaFLOPS calculation power. Quantum computing simulator (Atos QLM)	2021	

== Location ==
CESGA is located in the University of Santiago de Compostela Campus at the following address:

Avenida de Vigo, s/n Campus Sur 15705 Santiago de Compostela A Coruña - Spain

- Tel: +34 981 56 98 10
- Fax: +34 981 59 46 16
