= Magerit =

Supercomputer in Madrid, Spain

Coordinates: 40°24′15.65″N 03°50′4.75″W

Magerit 3
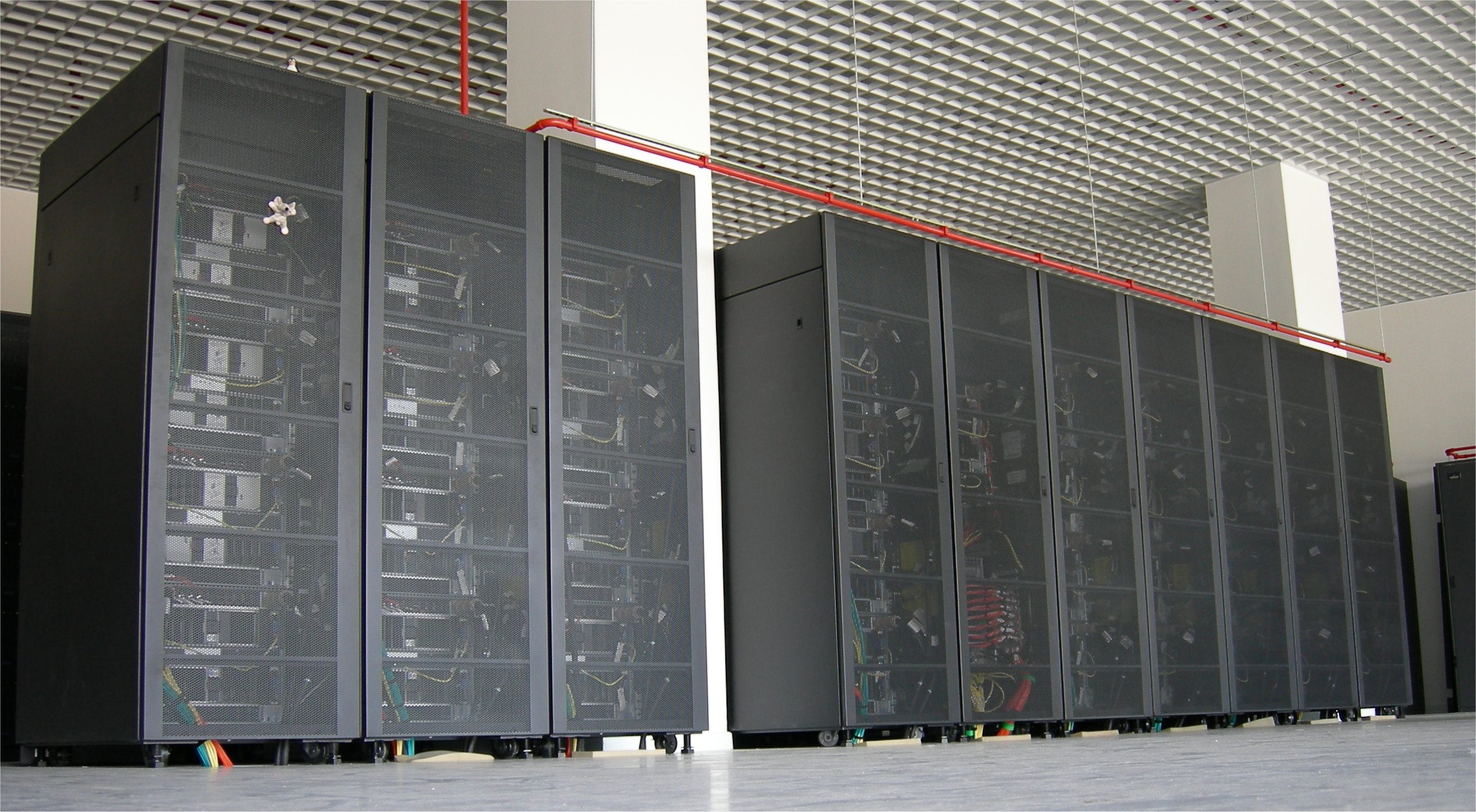
- Magerit supercomputer (2011)
- Active: 2006
- Location: CeSViMa (UPM); Spain
- Architecture: 64-bit Power ISA: PowerPC (2006-2010); IBM POWER7 (2011-2019); x86-64 (Xeon) (2019 onward)
- Operating system: SUSE Linux Enterprise Server; CentOS
- Memory: 13.056,0 TB
- Speed: 182.78 TFlops
- Ranking: TOP500: 136, June 2011
- Website: http://www.cesvima.upm.es

Magerit is one of the most powerful supercomputers in Spain. It also reached the second best Spanish position in the TOP500 list of supercomputers. It is installed in CeSViMa, a research center of the Technical University of Madrid.

Magerit was first installed in 2006 and reached the 9th fastest in Europe and the 34th in the world, the second best position of a Spanish supercomputer in the list. It also reached the 275th position in the first Green500 list published. It is no longer among the TOP500.

The second version, installed in 2011 reached the 1st position of Spain, 44th of Europe and 136th fastest of the world. It also reached the 18th position in the Green500 list.

Magerit (for *Materit or *Mageterit) is the most ancient recorded name of the current city of Madrid. The name comes from the Arabic name of a fortress built on the Manzanares River in the 9th century AD, and means "place of abundant water".

== History ==
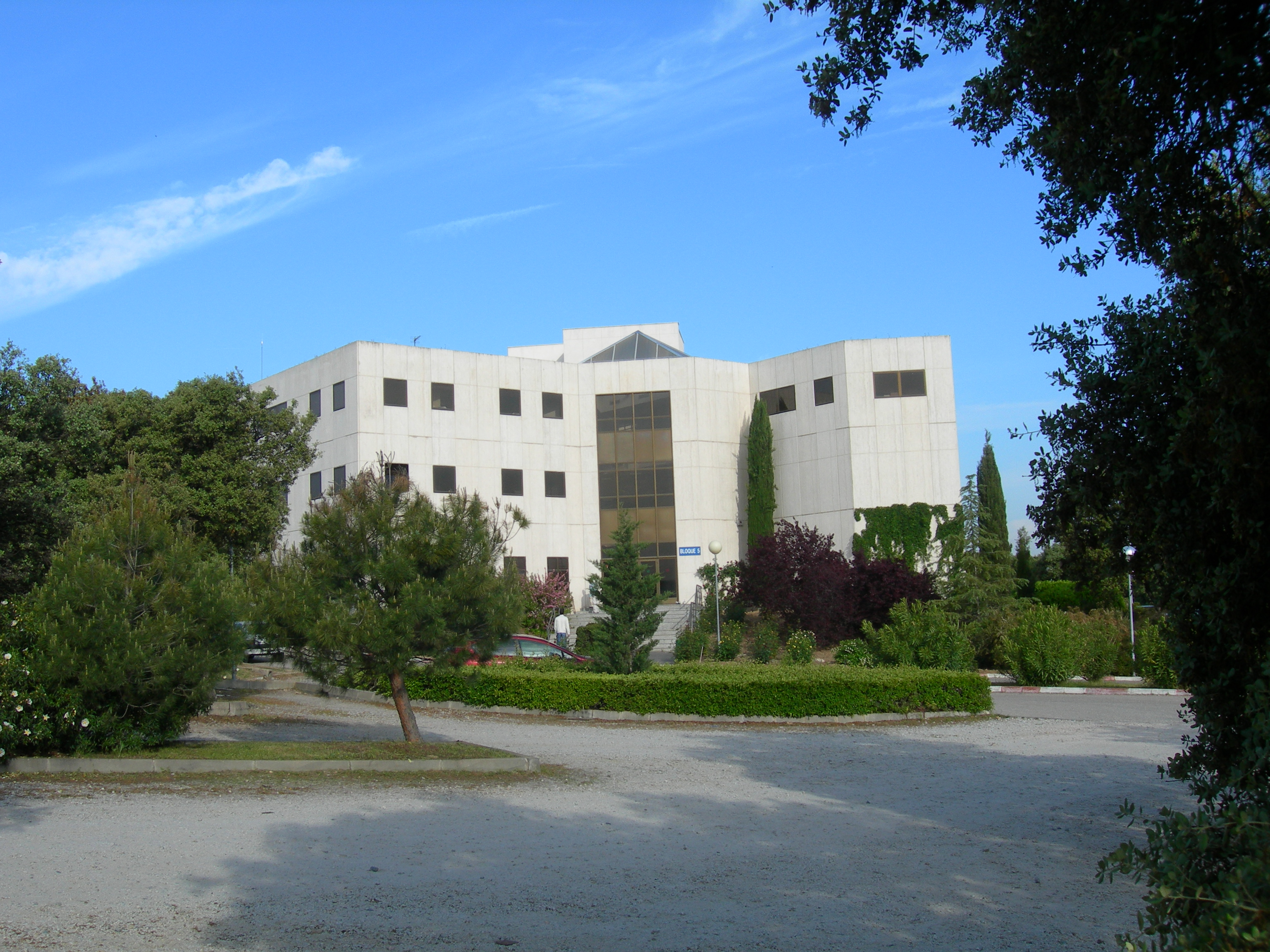
Computer Science School, first location of Magerit supercomputer

=== First steps (2005) ===
Magerit was created as a collaboration between Technical University of Madrid and IBM. The computer is housed in the newly created CeSViMa. This first version had only 124 nodes and was housed temporarily in the Computer Science School of Madrid. The funding was provided by the Spanish Ministry of Education and Science and the Autonomous Region of Madrid.

=== Joining the Spanish Supercomputer Network (2006–2007) ===
In late 2006 CeSViMa joined Spanish Supercomputing Network (Red Española de Supercomputación or RES in Spanish) and the supercomputer was upgraded. The new configuration has 1204 nodes reaching a speed of 14 TFLOPS. This is considered the first version due to its inclusion in the TOP500 list in the 34th position, the second best position of a Spanish supercomputer in the list.

In 2007 the first users from the access committee of Spanish Supercomputing Network (the agreement makes that the Network can schedule the use of the 68% of the resources) and users managed at local (CeSViMa) access committee (using the other 32%).

=== Migration and small upgrades (2008–2010) ===
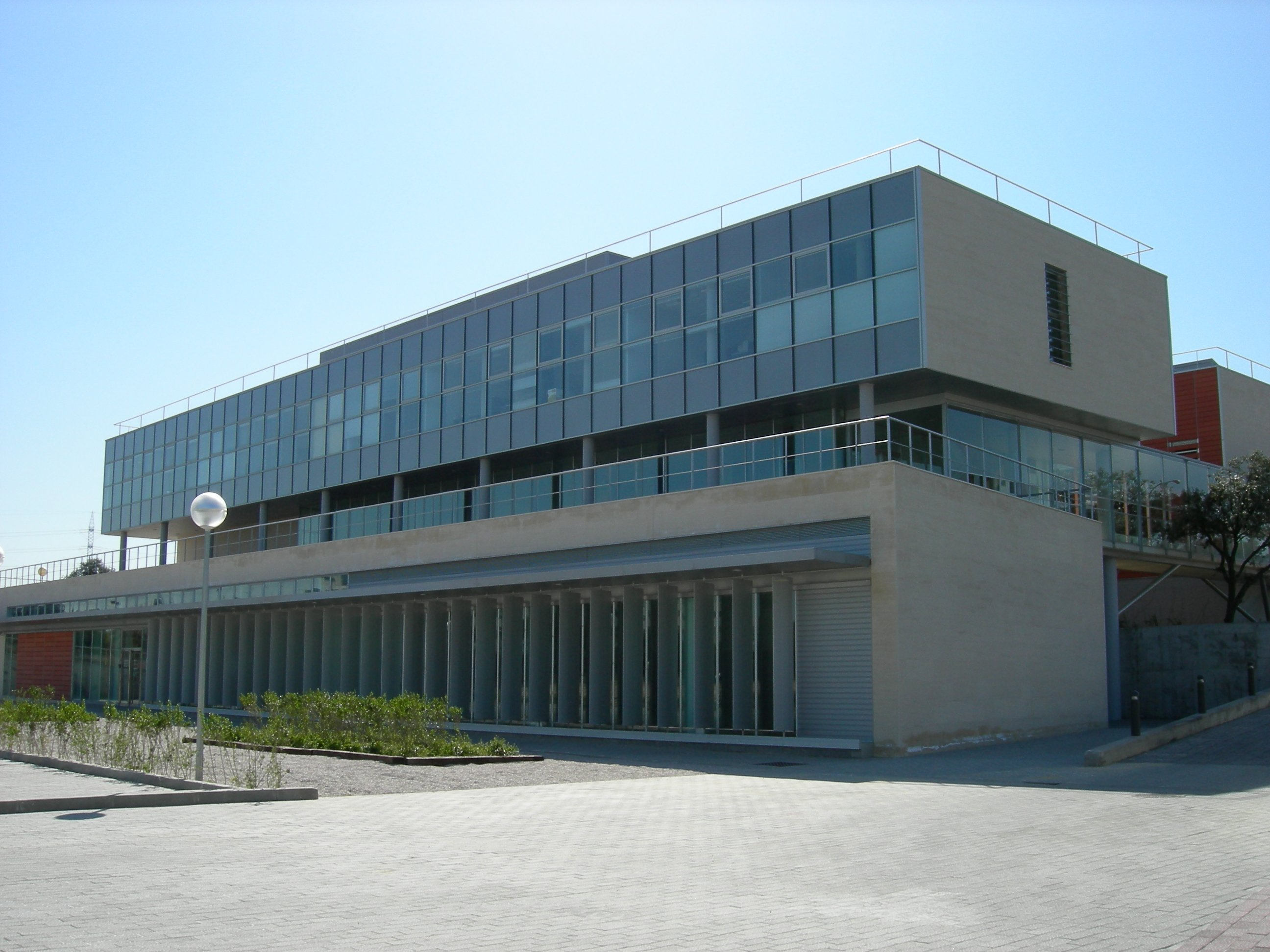
CeSViMa Building in the Scientific and Technology Park of UPM, current location

In May 2008, CeSViMa and Magerit supercomputer migrated to a new building in the same campus, only 500 meters from previous location at Computer Science School.

The computer was upgraded: change of communication switch, storage subsystem and replacement of some blades with a new version. This upgrade increased the power of the supercomputer near 2 TFLOPS reaching 15.95 TFLOPS. This upgrade did not avoid the fall from the TOP500 list in November 2008.

In this configuration the 59.7% of the supercomputer CPU time is assigned via RES access committee and 40.3% is assigned via CeSViMa policies.

One year later, in 2009, the operating system and other system software were upgraded (migrating to SUSE Linux Enterprise Server 10).

During 2010, CeSViMa acquire a new massive storage system with 1 petabyte of capacity in parallel with the own storage of Magerit.

=== Upgrade (2011) ===
In the first half of 2011, the supercomputer was fully upgraded replacing all computer nodes and interconnexion networks with the latest technologies in only one month (a record time).

This configuration reached the 136th position in the TOP500 list and the 18th position in the related Green500 list (both widely used as the supercomputer reference ranking) becoming the most powerful supercomputer and ecological supercomputer in Spain.

The new distribution of use is 80% managed by CeSViMa-UPM access committee and 20% managed by Spanish Supercomputing Network. Although the RES managed percent is lower, the resources donated to the network increased 4–5 times.

The upgrade does not include the storage subsystem (maintain the storage upgraded in 2008). There is a small upgrade planned in next few years to adapt the storage system to the new requirements.

== Architecture ==
Two versions of the supercomputer can be considered:

- The original 2006 (the 124 nodes of the agreement of 2005 was included in this configuration) with a small upgrade in 2008.
- The full upgrade in 2011 that makes Magerit the first supercomputer of Spain.

=== First version (2005–2010) ===
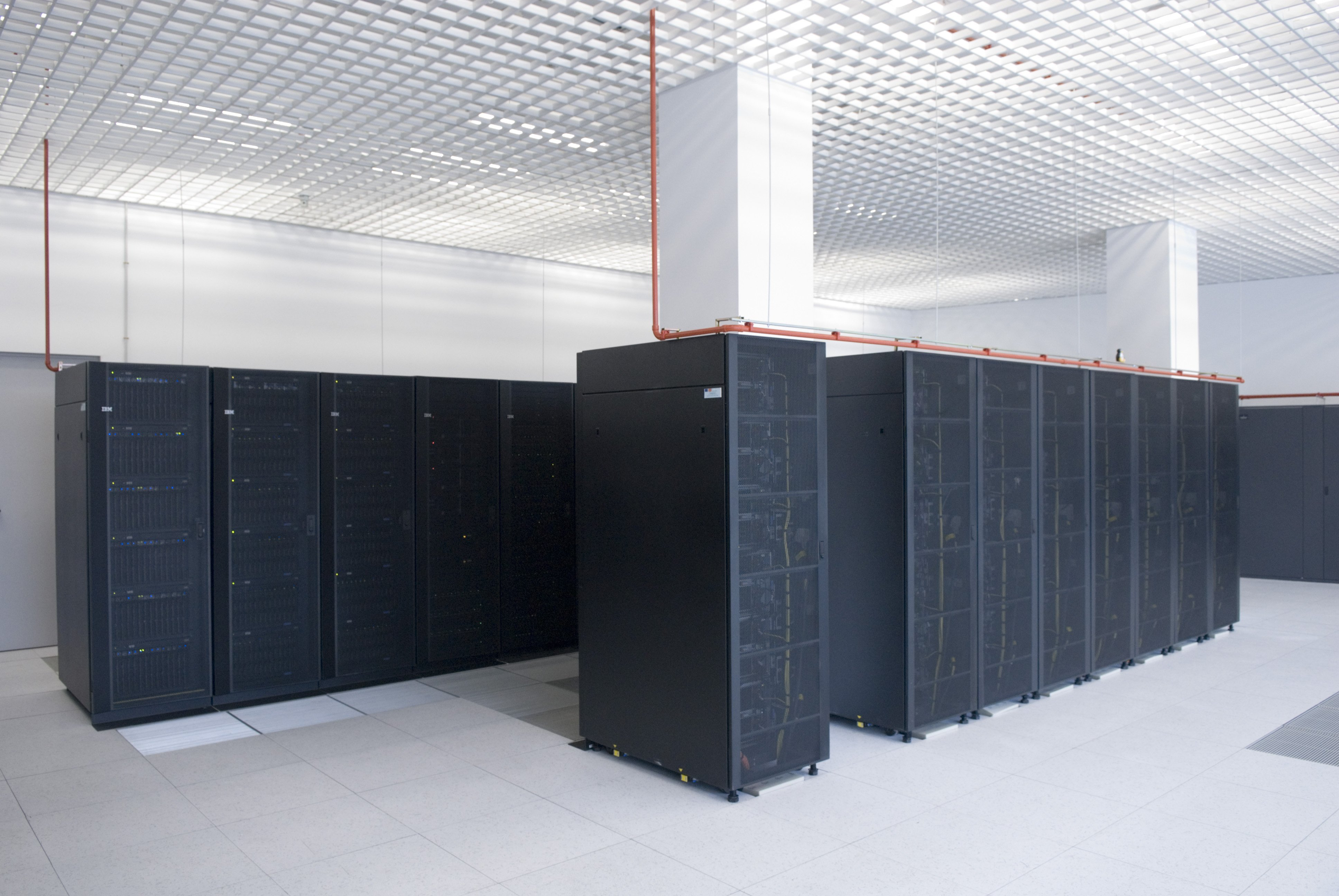
First version of Magerit Supercomputer (photo 2009)

This setup reached the second best position in the TOP500 list (34th, November 2006). When this version enters in production it reach the 2nd of Spain, 9th of Europe and 34th of the world in the TOP500 list and the 275th position in the first Green500 list

The final version setup (reached after the upgrade of 2008) is a cluster of 1204 nodes eServer BladeCenter (1036 JS20 and 168 JS21, both PowerPC 64-bit) under SUSE Linux Enterprise Server 9.

- Each JS20 node has two processors IBM PowerPC single-core 970FX (two cores) with 2.2 GHz, 4 GB of RAM and 40 GB of local hard disk.
- Each JS21 node has two processors IBM PowerPC dual-core 970FX (four cores) with 2.2 GHz, 8 GB of RAM and 80 GB of local hard disk.

The system has a distributed storage system with a capacity of 190 TB under GPFS. The access to this shared storage is provided by a high bandwidth switch that allows peaks of 1 Tbit/s.

All the nodes are interconnected with a low latency (2.6 – 3.2 μs) and high bandwidth network called Myrinet. This network is used only for MPI messages of users' tasks.

Finally, an auxiliary Ethernet network is deployed for administration tasks.

=== Second version (2011) ===
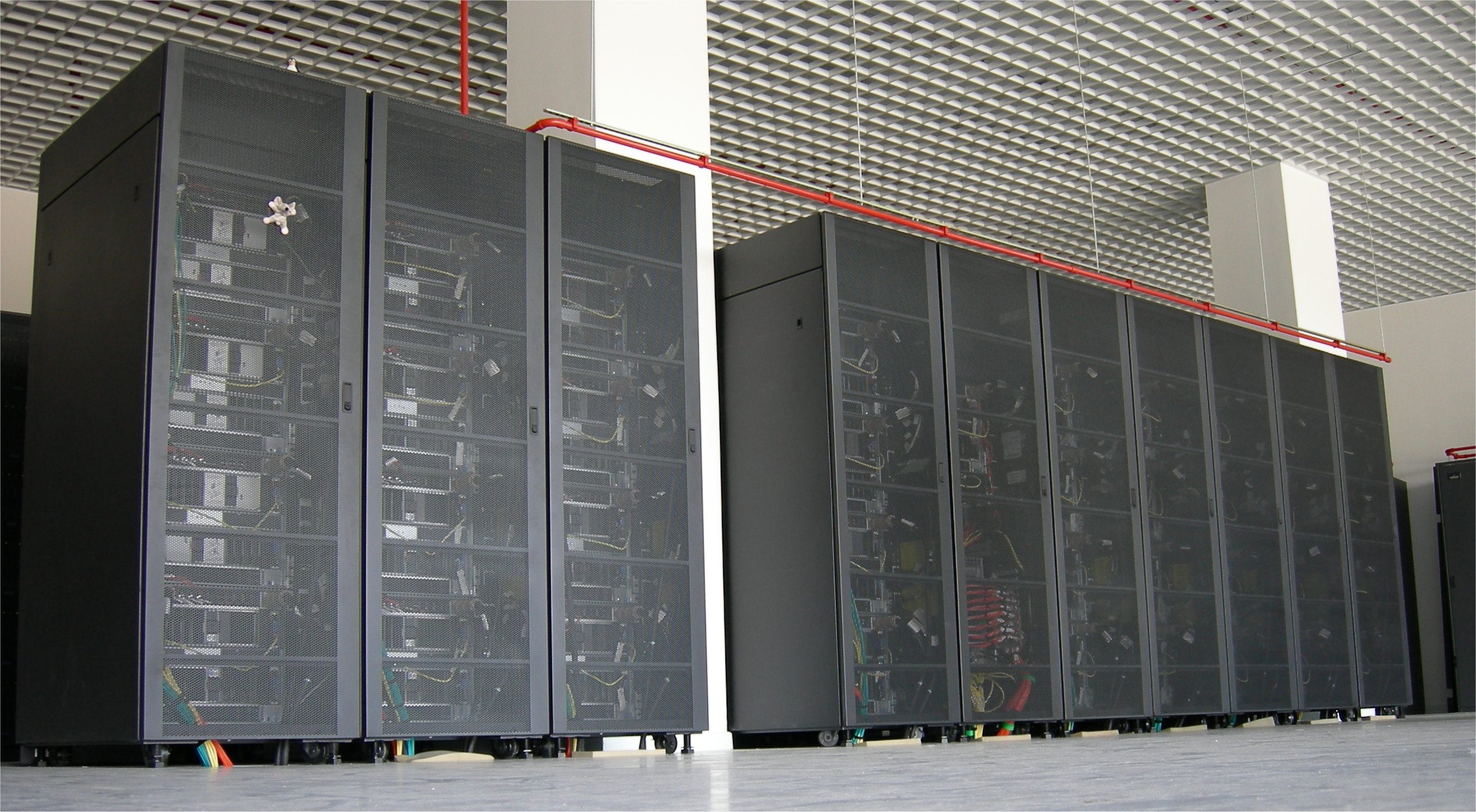
Second version of Magerit Supercomputer (photo 2011)

This setup converts Magerit into the most powerful supercomputer of Spain. When this setup enters in production stage in 2011, it reach the first position of Spain, 44th of Europe and 136th of the world.

The system maintains the cluster architecture with 245 PS702 nodes, each one with 16 cores in two 64-bit processors POWER7 (eight cores each) 3.0 GHz, 32 GB of RAM and 300 GB of local hard disk. Each core provides 18.38 Gflops.

The interconnection was replaced with an Infiniband network, a high-bandwidth (40 Gbit/s) and low latency (0.3 μs). The system maintains two independent Gigabit Ethernet for auxiliary tasks: deployment of images and access to storage subsystem.

The storage system remains the same (192 TB under GPFS) with a bandwidth near 1 Tbit/s.

The upgrade includes an update of the software: operating system (SLES11SP1), deployment system (xCAT, eXtreme Cluster Administration Toolkit) and all software and libraries used in the system.

=== Third version (2019) ===
Magerit is upgraded with Lenovo ThinkSystem SD530 nodes.

== Use ==
Magerit processes batch jobs with large processing requirements, such as models of the universe, simulations of materials and climate models. An example of project is the project Cajal Blue Brain (Spanish participation in Blue Brain Project).

These jobs are organized by a queue manager. Due to the characteristic of the jobs (runs in hundred of CPUs a few days) its impossible to use more conventional access to the resources. The supercomputer must be running jobs without interrupts all the year.

The use of a queue manager of batch jobs allows a global scheduling of the resources increasing the use of the resources and a fair play between users.

== Access to resources ==
The system is available to any person, institution or company that requests access via:

- Directly CeSViMa, filling the request for access forms on CeSViMa web page.
- As a collaboration agreement with CeSViMa.
- Via Spanish Supercomputing Network. This is a competitive process. The access committee evaluates all the projects and can assign resources on any other supercomputer of the network so it can be scheduled in the 20% of Magerit resources managed by RES.
