= Gary Sukeforth =

American politician and businessperson

Gary E. Sukeforth

Member of the Maine House of Representatives (District 60)
- In office December 2002 – December 2004

Member of the Maine House of Representatives (District 95)
- In office December 2014 – December 2016

Personal details
- Party: Unenrolled (independent)
- Education: University of Maine; Pennsylvania State University
- Profession: Grocery store owner

Gary E Sukeforth (born 1960) is an American politician and businessperson from Maine. Sukeforth is a former unenrolled (independent) member of the Maine House of Representatives from Appleton, Maine in Knox County. He is the owner of the Common Market grocery store in Union, Maine. He served a two-year term in the House of Representatives from 2002 to 2004 while a resident of Union.

Sukeforth characterizes himself as fiscally conservative and socially moderate. He said in a 2014 candidate questionnaire that he supports marijuana legalization and the expansion of workfare in Maine.

Sukeforth is a 1978 graduate of Camden-Rockport High School. He graduated from the University of Maine in 1983 with a B.S. in Agricultural & Resource Economics. He also attended Pennsylvania State University for graduate school from 1983 to 1985. He is divorced with no children.
