= Cajal Institute =

Spanish research center

Coordinates: 40°26′54″N 3°40′49″W

- Instituto de Neurobiología Ramón y Cajal
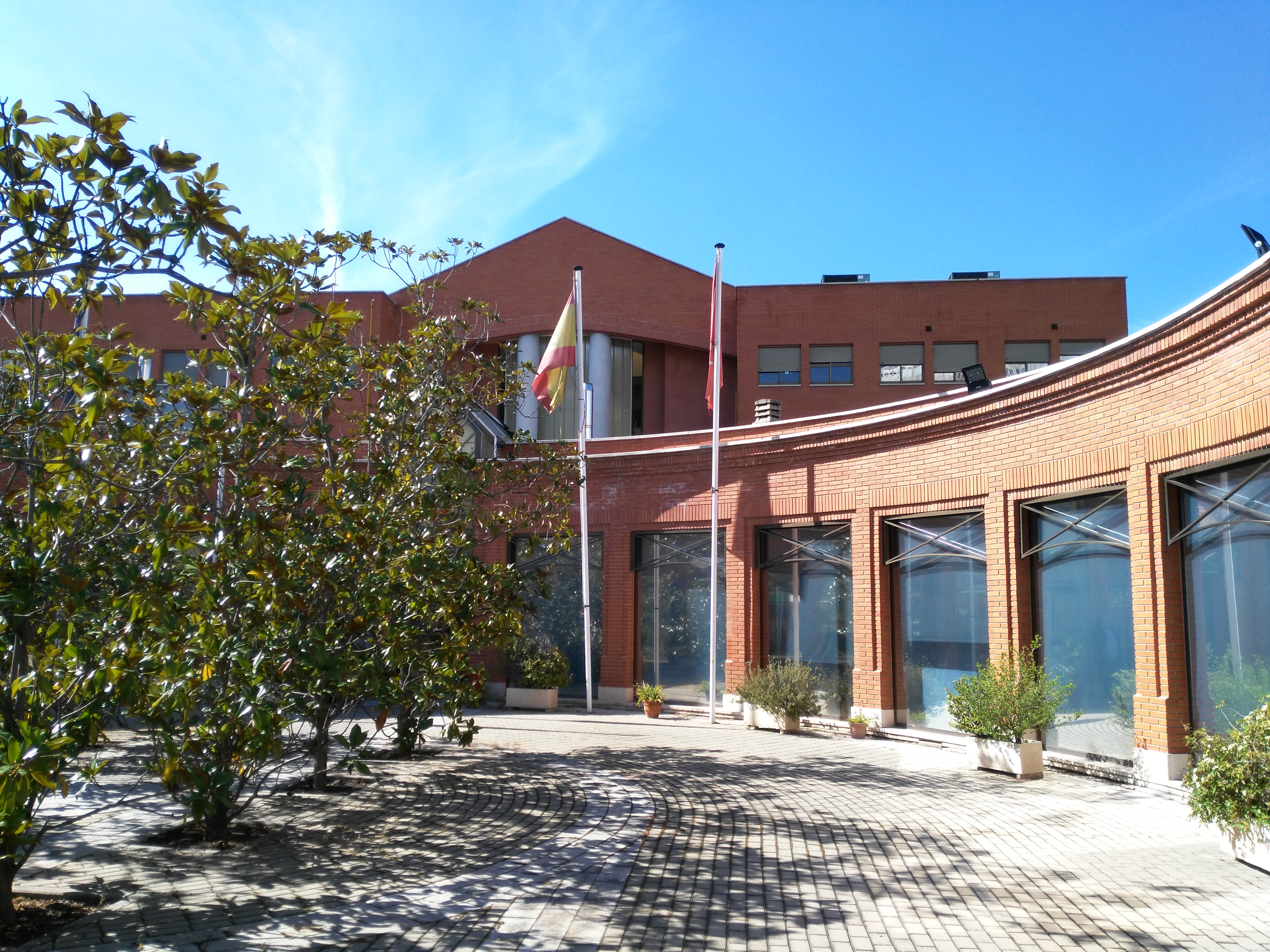

Neuroscience research centers overview
- Formed: 1920
- Jurisdiction: Spain
- Headquarters: Av. Doctor Arce, 37. 28002 Madrid
- Website: cajal.csic.es/en/home/

The Cajal Institute (IC) is a research center in neurobiology which belongs to the Spanish National Research Council (CSIC). The IC originates from the Laboratorio de Investigaciones Biológicas, founded in 1900 by order of King Alfonso XIII on the occasion of the Moscow Prize to Santiago Ramón y Cajal (1852–1934). Following Cajal's award of the Nobel Prize in Physiology and Medicine in 1906 and the 1907 creation of the Junta de Ampliación de Estudios, Cajal was appointed President of the Junta. A royal decree by king Alfonso XIII established the construction of a new building and the appointment of Cajal as its first director in 1920.

== History ==
The building, finally inaugurated in 1932, was located in the hill of San Blas and changed its name to Cajal Institute to honour the memory of its founder. Since the beginning, its activity has focused on the structure and function of the nervous system. It is the oldest neurobiology research center in Spain. Along its more than 100 years of existence, renowned scientists and professionals have spread worldwide and contributed to the advancement of neurobiology.

The Cajal Institute is a benchmark for Spanish neuroscience. It is a multidisciplinary research center in which neuroscientists specializing in the embryonic and adult nervous systems come together from multiple points of view, including cellular and molecular neurobiology, neuropharmacology, electrophysiology, systems neurobiology, and neuropathology. During its recent history, the Cajal Institute has nurtured neuroscientists at the Institute of Neurosciences in Alicante, the National Center for Tetraplegics in Toledo, and different Spanish universities.

=== Headquarters ===
In 1957 it moved to a new building on Velázquez street, sharing the space with other Institutes (Biological Research Center). Finally, in 1989 a new building was built on Doctor Arce Avenue, which is where it is currently located.

== Organization ==
Cajal Institute has three research departments:

- Molecular, Cellular and Developmental Neurobiology
- Functional and Systems Neurobiology
- Translational Neuroscience

== See also ==
- Javier de Felipe
