= Robert Markram =

South African rugby union player (1975–2001)

- Born: Robert Lance Markram; 15 September 1975 Kuruman, Northern Cape
- Died: 6 July 2001 (aged 25)
- Height: 1.84 m (6 ft 0 in)
- Weight: 90 kg (198 lb)
- School: Kathu High School

Rugby union career
- Position(s): Flyhalf, Wing, Fullback
Provincial / State sides
Years	Team	Apps	(Points)
1997–1998	Griquas	41	(156)
1999–2000	Western Province	8	(25)
2001	Boland Cavaliers	5	(5)
Super Rugby
Years	Team	Apps	(Points)
1999 & 2001	Stormers	12	(5)
International career
Years	Team	Apps	(Points)
1998	South Africa (tour)	4	

Robert Lance Markram (15 September 1975 – 6 July 2001) was a South African rugby union player.

== Playing career ==
Markram matriculated at Kathu High School in the Northern Cape. He made his senior provincial debut for the Griquas in 1997 and in the 1998 season he scored 24 tries, which was a Griquas record for most tries in a first-class season. Markram also played for Western Province, the Boland Cavaliers and in the Super Rugby competition, for the Stormers.

Markram toured with the Springboks to Britain and Ireland in 1998. He did not play in any test matches for the Springboks but played in four tour matches.

Markram died on 6 July 2001 in a motor vehicle accident on the road between Kimberley and Barkly West.

== See also ==
- List of South Africa national rugby union players – Springbok no. 677
