= Henry Markram =

South African-born Israeli neuroscientist (born 1962)

- הנרי מרקרם
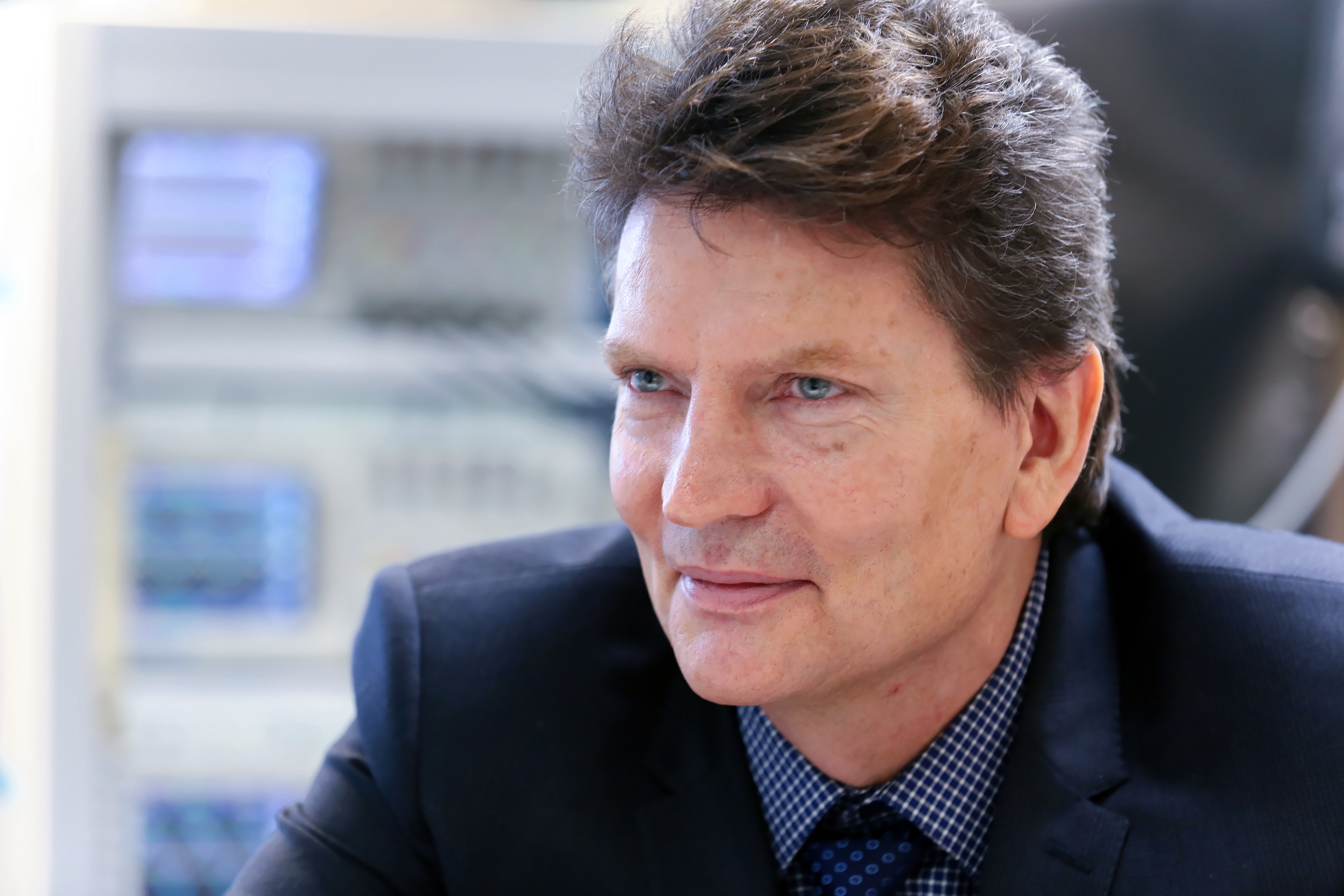
- Markram in 2013
- Born: 28 March 1962 (age 64); South Africa
- Education: University of Cape Town (BSc); Weizmann Institute of Science (PhD); Kearsney College
- Known for: Blue Brain Project; Human Brain Project; Spike-timing-dependent plasticity
- Awards: Fulbright Scholar
- Scientific career
- Fields: Neuroscience
- Workplaces: École Polytechnique Fédérale de Lausanne
- Thesis: Acetylcholine interacts with the NMDA receptor through the phosphoinositide pathway (1991)
- Doctoral advisor: Menahem Segal
- Website: people.epfl.ch/henry.markram

Henry John Markram (Hebrew: הנרי מרקרם; born 28 March 1962) is a South African-born Israeli neuroscientist, professor at the École Polytechnique Fédérale de Lausanne (EPFL) in Switzerland and director of the Blue Brain Project and founder of the Human Brain Project.

== Education ==
Henry Markram obtained his Bachelor of Science degree in physiology and the history and philosophy of science from the University of Cape Town, South Africa and his PhD in neurobiology from the Weizmann Institute of Science, Israel in 1991, under the supervision of Menahem Segal. During his PhD work, he discovered a link between acetylcholine and memory mechanisms by showing that acetylcholine modulates the primary receptor linked to synaptic plasticity.

== Personal life ==
Born in South Africa, Markram is now an Israeli citizen. Markram met his current wife, fellow neuroscientist Kamila Markram, at the Max Planck Institute for Brain Research in Frankfurt. They moved to the École Polytechnique Fédérale de Lausanne together and, in 2007, founded Frontiers Media. Markram has been married twice and has a total of five children, one of whom, Kai, is autistic.

Markram's biography "The Boy Who Felt Too Much," written by Lorenz Wagner, reveals a story about his relationship with his son, Kai.

== Research ==
Following his PhD, Markram went to the United States as a Fulbright Scholar at the National Institutes of Health (NIH). As a Minerva Fellow he then went to the Laboratory of Bert Sakmann at the Max Planck Institute, Heidelberg, Germany, where he along with his colleagues discovered calcium transients in dendrites evoked by sub-threshold activity, and by single action potentials propagating back into dendrites. He also began studying the connectivity between neurons, describing in great detail how layer 5 pyramidal neurons are interconnected.

Some of his work altered the relative timing of single pre- and post-synaptic action potentials to reveal a learning mechanism operating between neurons where the relative timing in the millisecond range affects the coupling strength between neurons. The importance of such timing has been reproduced in many brain regions and is known as spike timing-dependent synaptic plasticity (STDP).

Markram was appointed assistant professor at the Weizmann Institute of Science, where his group started systematically dissecting out the neocortical column. He along with his postdocs and PhD students discovered that synaptic learning can also involve a change in synaptic dynamics (called redistribution of synaptic efficacy) rather than merely changing the strengths of connections. He and his group also studied principles governing neocortical microcircuit structure, function, and emergent dynamics. Together with Wolfgang Maass he and his team developed the so-called theory of liquid state machine, or high entropy computing.

In 2002, he moved to EPFL as full professor and founder/director of the Brain Mind Institute and Director of the Center for Neuroscience and Technology. At the BMI, in the Laboratory for Neural Microcircuitry, Markram continues to study the organisation of the neocortical column, develops tools to carry out multi-neuron patch clamp recordings combined with laser and electrical stimulation as well as multi-site electrical recording, chemical imaging and gene expression.

In 2013, the European Union funded the Human Brain Project, led by Markram, to the tune of $1.3 billion. Markram claimed that the project would create a simulation of the entire human brain on a supercomputer within a decade, revolutionising the treatment of Alzheimer's disease and other brain disorders. Less than two years into it, the project was recognised to be mismanaged and its claims overblown, and Markram was asked to step down.

On 8 October 2015, the Blue Brain Project published the first digital reconstruction and simulation of the micro-circuitry of a neonatal rat somatosensory cortex.

== Selected publications ==
- 1997: Markram, H.; Lübke, J.; Frotscher, M.; Sakmann, B. (1997). "Regulation of Synaptic Efficacy by Coincidence of Postsynaptic APs and EPSPs". Science. 275 (5297): 213–215. doi:10.1126/science.275.5297.213. PMID 8985014. S2CID 46640132.
- 1997: Tsodyks, M. V.; Markram, H. (1997). "The neural code between neocortical pyramidal neurons depends on neurotransmitter release probability". Proceedings of the National Academy of Sciences. 94 (2): 719–723. Bibcode:1997PNAS...94..719T. doi:10.1073/pnas.94.2.719. PMC 19580. PMID 9012851.
- 2000: Gupta, A.; Wang, Y.; Markram, H. (2000). "Organizing Principles for a Diversity of GABAergic Interneurons and Synapses in the Neocortex". Science. 287 (5451): 273–278. Bibcode:2000Sci...287..273G. doi:10.1126/science.287.5451.273. PMID 10634775.
- 2002: Maass, Wolfgang; Natschläger, Thomas; Markram, Henry (2002). "Real-Time Computing Without Stable States: A New Framework for Neural Computation Based on Perturbations". Neural Computation. 14 (11): 2531–2560. doi:10.1162/089976602760407955. PMID 12433288. S2CID 1045112.
- 2004: Markram, Henry; Toledo-Rodriguez, Maria; Wang, Yun; Gupta, Anirudh; Silberberg, Gilad; Wu, Caizhi (2004). "Interneurons of the neocortical inhibitory system". Nature Reviews Neuroscience. 5 (10): 793–807. doi:10.1038/nrn1519. PMID 15378039. S2CID 382334.
- 2010: Markram, Kamila; Markram, Henry (21 December 2010). "The Intense World Theory – a unifying theory of the neurobiology of autism". Frontiers in Human Neuroscience. 4: 224. doi:10.3389/fnhum.2010.00224. ISSN 1662-5161. PMC 3010743. PMID 21191475. "The proposed neuropathology is hyper-functioning of local neural microcircuits, best characterized by hyper-reactivity and hyper-plasticity. Such hyper-functional microcircuits are speculated to become autonomous and memory trapped leading to the core cognitive consequences of hyper-perception, hyper-attention, hyper-memory and hyper-emotionality. The theory is centered on the neocortex and the amygdala, but could potentially be applied to all brain regions. (...) This may lead to obsessively detailed information processing of fragments of the world and an involuntarily and systematic decoupling of the autist from what becomes a painfully intense world."
- 2011: Perin, R.; Berger, T. K.; Markram, H. (2011). "A synaptic organizing principle for cortical neuronal groups". Proceedings of the National Academy of Sciences. 108 (13): 5419–5424. Bibcode:2011PNAS..108.5419P. doi:10.1073/pnas.1016051108. PMC 3069183. PMID 21383177.
- 2015: Markram, Henry; Muller, Eilif; Ramaswamy, Srikanth; Reimann, Michael W.; Abdellah, Marwan; Sanchez, Carlos Aguado; Ailamaki, Anastasia; Alonso-Nanclares, Lidia; Antille, Nicolas; Arsever, Selim; Kahou, Guy Antoine Atenekeng; Berger, Thomas K.; Bilgili, Ahmet; Buncic, Nenad; Chalimourda, Athanassia; Chindemi, Giuseppe; Courcol, Jean-Denis; Delalondre, Fabien; Delattre, Vincent; Druckmann, Shaul; Dumusc, Raphael; Dynes, James; Eilemann, Stefan; Gal, Eyal; Gevaert, Michael Emiel; Ghobril, Jean-Pierre; Gidon, Albert; Graham, Joe W.; Gupta, Anirudh; et al. (2015). "Reconstruction and Simulation of Neocortical Microcircuitry". Cell. 163 (2): 456–492. doi:10.1016/j.cell.2015.09.029. PMID 26451489. S2CID 14466831.

== See also ==
- Javier de Felipe
- Blue Brain Project
