= Magnesium L-threonate =

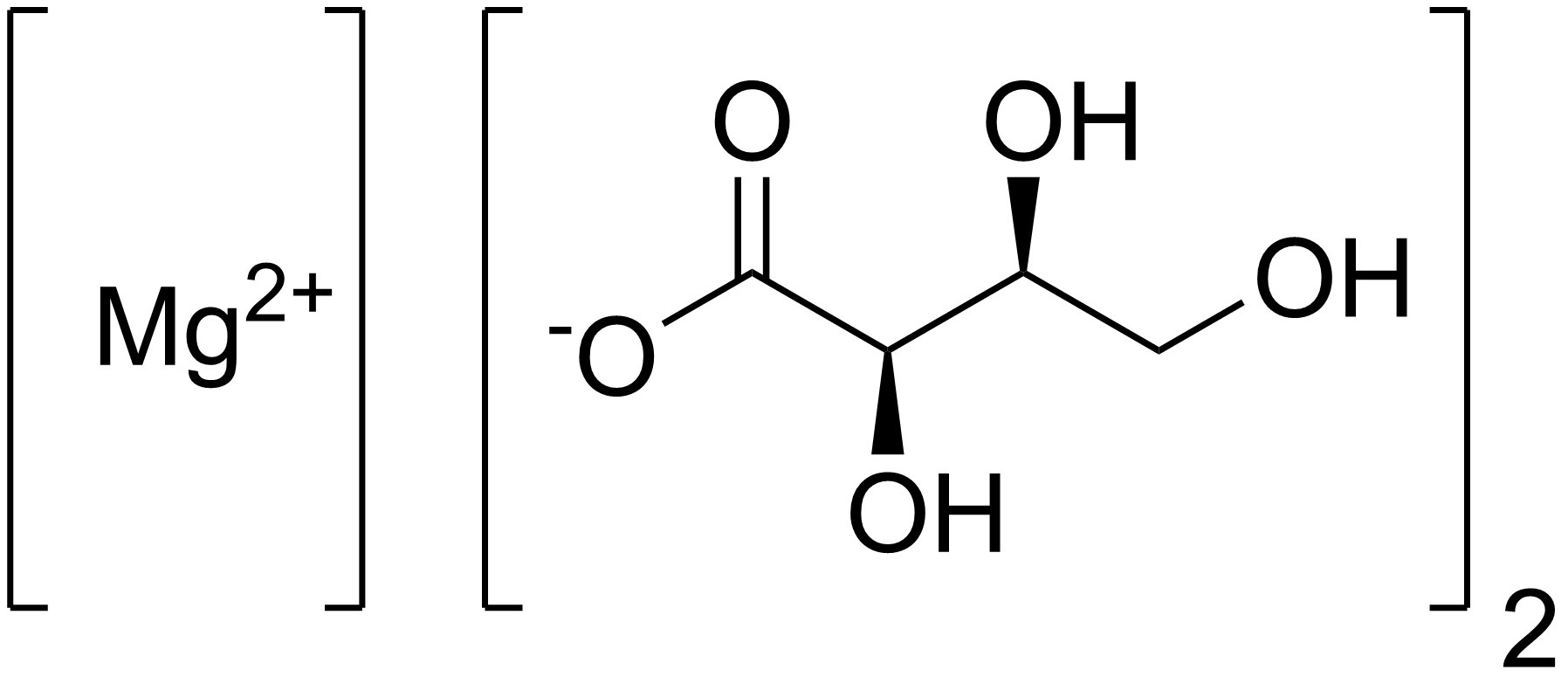

Names
- IUPAC name Magnesium bis[(2R,3S)-2,3,4-trihydroxybutanoate]
- Other names MgT

Identifiers
CAS Number	778571-57-6; 500304-76-7 (hydrate)
3D model (JSmol)	Interactive image
ChemSpider	24590125
PubChem CID	53395228
UNII	1Y26ZZ0OTM
CompTox Dashboard (EPA)	DTXSID30670457
- InChI: InChI=1S/2C4H8O5.Mg/c2*5-1-2(6)3(7)4(8)9;/h2*2-3,5-7H,1H2,(H,8,9);/q;;+2/p-2/t2*2-,3+;/m00./s1 Key: YVJOHOWNFPQSPP-BALCVSAKSA-L; InChI=1/2C4H8O5.Mg/c2*5-1-2(6)3(7)4(8)9;/h2*2-3,5-7H,1H2,(H,8,9);/q;;+2/p-2/t2*2-,3+;/m00./s1 Key: YVJOHOWNFPQSPP-HSLCKNDHBH
- SMILES: [O-]C([C@H](O)[C@@H](O)CO)=O.[O-]C([C@H](O)[C@@H](O)CO)=O.[Mg+2]

Properties
Chemical formula	C_{8}H_{14}MgO_{10}
Molar mass	294.495 g·mol^{−1}
- Except where otherwise noted, data are given for materials in their standard state (at 25 °C [77 °F], 100 kPa). verify (what is ?) Infobox references

Magnesium L-threonate is a magnesium salt of L-threonic acid having the formula Mg(C_{4}H_{7}O_{5})_{2}.

Magnesium L-threonate is reported to cross the blood-brain barrier more readily than regular magnesium ions.

One small study reports that magnesium L-threonate improves cognitive function in healthy adults, compared to placebo; other magnesium formulations were not compared.
