= Triblade =

Triblade may refer to:

- A bayonet or knife with three cutting edges
- A helicopter rotor having three blades
- A blade server module of the IBM Roadrunner supercomputer
