= Hitachi Adaptable Modular Storage 2000 =

Adaptable Modular Storage 2000 is the brand name of Hitachi Data Systems mid-range storage platforms.

The Hitachi Adaptable Modular Storage 2000 family of storage systems was announced in October, 2008. They can be reconfigured and optimized to accommodate changing business requirements. This midrange product family is built around a serial attached SCSI (SAS) architecture and has a symmetric active/active controller design.

This family of storage systems include:

- Hitachi Adaptable Modular Storage 2100
- Hitachi Adaptable Modular Storage 2300
- Hitachi Adaptable Modular Storage 2500
- Hitachi Adaptable Modular Storage 2500DC

All models support RAID-6 disk configurations, Fibre Channel and iSCSI host interfaces, as well as the ability to intermix Flash drives with SAS and SATA disk drives in the same tray. They also support both Fibre Channel and iSCSI host interfaces in the same controller.

The AMS 2000 family of storage systems are available with just a few terabytes of storage up to 1,417 TB of storage. These storage systems support upgrade in place to larger models of the AMS 2000 family as well as migration to new RAID groups while the system is in operation.

== Automated storage controller ==
Each AMS2000 model comes with dual controllers that automate many storage management tasks. The symmetric active/active architecture with dynamic load balancing provides integrated, automated, front-to-back-end I/O load balancing. In this design both controllers are active and able to dynamically access any volume from a host port on either controller with no penalty on performance. By eliminating the need for each volume to be assigned to an owning controller, servers can be connected to either controller on an AMS2000 without establishing a primary and failover path to their volumes. With this design SAN path management software is not required.

Volumes can be accessed from either controller at the same speed. As a result, microcode updates can be done while the system is operating and without any interruption to host I/Os. In addition, the workload of each controller is continually monitored and can be automatically brought into balance whenever necessary. As a result of the monitoring and automated load balancing the utilization imbalances between controllers which traditionally have led to performance bottlenecks can be avoided.

== SAS Architecture ==
SAS (Serial Attached SCSI) is the interface architecture used to transmit data from the storage controllers to the disk drives in the Adaptable Modular Storage 2000 family. The SAS interface is a full duplex, point-to-point architecture with up to 9600 MB/sec of total system bandwidth and up to 32 links available for concurrent I/O activity. This design eliminates FC Loop arbitration resulting in better performance and enables improved end user troubleshooting by detecting and displaying failed drives automatically.

== Additional Features ==
The AMS 2000 family of storage systems includes Hitachi Dynamic Provisioning software, which provides proprietary automatic optimized wide striping of data across all available disks. It enables storage to be provisioned when the application actually requires it, rather than at allocation time.

The storage capacity of the Hitachi Adaptable Modular Storage 2000 family scales to 1,417 TB. With the bandwidth provided by the SAS architecture, performance continues to increase as more drives are added to the system.

All models of the Hitachi Adaptable Modular Storage 2000 family support host path failover, fully redundant, hot swappable components, online microcode updates and mirrored cache with battery backup. The active-active controllers include automatic failover.

Advanced security capabilities include Hitachi Data Retention Utility software with its “write once, read many” (WORM) feature that protects data from overwrites or erasures for long periods of time. System management access limits authorization to change the system. System audit logging records all system changes. Communications between the management software and storage are encrypted.

The AMS 2000 family lets you choose drives to meet your business needs:

- Flash
- 15K RPM SAS
- 7200 RPM SATA II

The High Density Storage Tray provides 48 SATA or 38 SAS disks in a 4U (176mm) high tray. Up to 480 disks can be installed in a single rack without sacrificing performance or availability.

This family of storage systems supports retracting the heads on SATA disk drives or even intelligently spinning down drives that are not active to reduce energy consumption. IN addition, the system fans operate at variable speeds, determined by the system’s internal temperature, which can also result in lower energy consumption. It also offers the Dense Expansion Tray option which holds up to 48 SATA or 38 SAS disks in a 4U (176mm) high tray.

The AMS 2000 family of storage systems provides software wizards and web-based tools for configuration, management and maintenance. Flexible sparing of disk drives eliminates the need to copy back after a RAID group rebuild.

== Hitachi Adaptable Modular Storage 2100 ==
The AMS 2100 has the ability to scale capacity to 469 TB and delivers performance of up to 400K IOPS. This storage system has 16 concurrent disk I/O paths providing up to 4800 MB/s of total system bandwidth. It has connectivity for up to 1024 virtual server ports and supports the intermix high performance SAS drives and cost optimized SATA drives in the same system for tiered storage solutions. It can attach to both Fibre Channel and iSCSI storage networks.

== Hitachi Adaptable Modular Storage 2300 ==
The AMS 2300 has the ability to scale capacity to 708 TB and can deliver performance of up to 400K IOPS. It supports connectivity to 2048 virtual server ports and is able to intermix high performance SAS drives and cost optimized SATA drives in the same system. This system has 16 concurrent disk I/O paths providing up to 4800 MB/s of total system bandwidth. It can also attach to either or both Fibre Channel and iSCSI storage networks for storage consolidation.

== Hitachi Adaptable Modular Storage 2500 ==
The AMS 2500 is capable of scaling capacity to 1,417 TB and delivering performance up to 900K IOPS with connectivity for up to 2048 virtual server ports. It has 32 concurrent disk I/O paths providing 9600 MB/s of total system bandwidth. This storage system supports intermix of high performance SAS drives and cost optimized SATA drives for tiered storage solutions. It supports connectivity to Fibre Channel and iSCSI storage networks for storage consolidation.

== Hitachi Adaptable Modular Storage 2500DC ==
The AMS 2500DC is designed for operation in DC powered data centers typically found in telco central offices and large or enterprise businesses. It is capable of scaling capacity up to 472 TB and delivering performance up to 900K IOPS with connectivity for up to 2048 virtual server ports. This model supports intermix of high performance SAS drives and cost optimized SATA drives in the same system for tiered storage solutions. It supports connectivity to Fibre Channel and iSCSI storage networks for storage consolidation. This models employs NEBS-3/ETSI compliant, -48V DC power supply for telcos and DC powered data centers.

== Hitachi Adaptable Modular Storage Physical Characteristics ==
	AMS 2100	AMS 2300	AMS 2500	AMS 2500DC
Raw capacity	SATA - 469TB SAS - 78 TB	SATA - 708TB SAS - 138 TB	SATA - 1,417TB SAS - 276 TB	SATA - 472TB SAS - 210 TB
Internal disk drives (min-max)	SAS 146 GB (15K RPM); 300 GB (10K RPM); 300 GB (15K RPM); 400 GB (10K RPM); 450 GB (15K RPM); 600 GB (10K RPM); 600 GB (15K RPM); 600 GB (15K RPM, self-encrypting); 2 TB (7200 RPM); SATA II; 500 GB (7200 RPM); 1 TB (7200 RPM); 2 TB (7200 RPM); 3 TB (7200 RPM); Internal flash drives 200 GB (SAS)			SAS 300 GB (15K RPM); 450 GB (15K RPM); SATA II; 1 TB (7200 RPM)
Internal disk drives (min-max)	Min-Max # of drives SAS: 4-136; SATA: 4-159; Internal Flash drives: 0-30	Min-Max # of drives SAS & SATA: 4-240; Internal Flash drives: 0-30	Min-Max # of drives SAS & SATA: 4-480; Internal Flash drives: 0-60	Min-Max # of drives SAS & SATA: 4-480; Internal Flash drives: 30
Host interfaces	Fibre Channel: 8 Gbit/s iSCSI: GigE, 10GbE			Fibre Channel: 4 Gbit/s iSCSI: GigE, 10GbE
Host connection options	Fibre Channel: 4 Fibre Channel: 8 Fibre Channel: 4 and iSCSI: 4	Fibre Channel: 4 Fibre Channel: 8 Fibre Channel: 8 and iSCSI: 4	Fibre Channel: 16 iSCSI: 8 Fibre Channel: 8 and iSCSI: 4	
Maximum attached hosts through virtual ports	1024	2048		
SAS links	16		32	
LUNs	Max size: 60 TB			
LUNs	Max #: 2048	Max #: 4096		
RAID Support	RAID-0 (SAS drives only) RAID-1; RAID-1+0; RAID-5; RAID-6			
RAID Support	Max RAID groups: 50	Max RAID groups: 75	Max RAID groups: 100	
Availability	Nondisruptive replacement of major FRU components Nondisruptive hot-pluggable disks Nondisruptive microcode updates Hi-Track Remote Monitoring system			
Performance	Controller cache: 4 GB–8 GB (per system)	Controller cache: 8 GB–16 GB (per system)	Controller cache: 16 GB–32 GB (per system)	Controller cache: 16 GB–32 GB (per system)
Performance	Cache binding: Hitachi Cache Residency Manager feature Logical partitioning: Hitachi Cache Partition Manager feature			

== See also ==
- Hitachi Data Systems
- Hitachi
