= IBM BladeCenter =

Blade server architecture by IBM

- BladeCenter E front side: 8 blade servers (HS20) followed by 6 empty slots
- Also known as: IBM eServer BladeCenter (2002-2005)
- Developer: IBM
- Type: Blade server
- Released: 2002
- Discontinued: 2012
- CPU: x86 (HS/LS series); POWER (JS/PS series); CELL (QS series)
- Successor: IBM Flex System

The IBM BladeCenter was IBM's blade server architecture, until it was replaced by Flex System in 2012. The x86 division was later sold to Lenovo in 2014.

BladeCenter E back side, showing on the left two FC switches and two Ethernet switches. On the right side a management module with VGA and PS/2 keyboard and mouse cables connected.

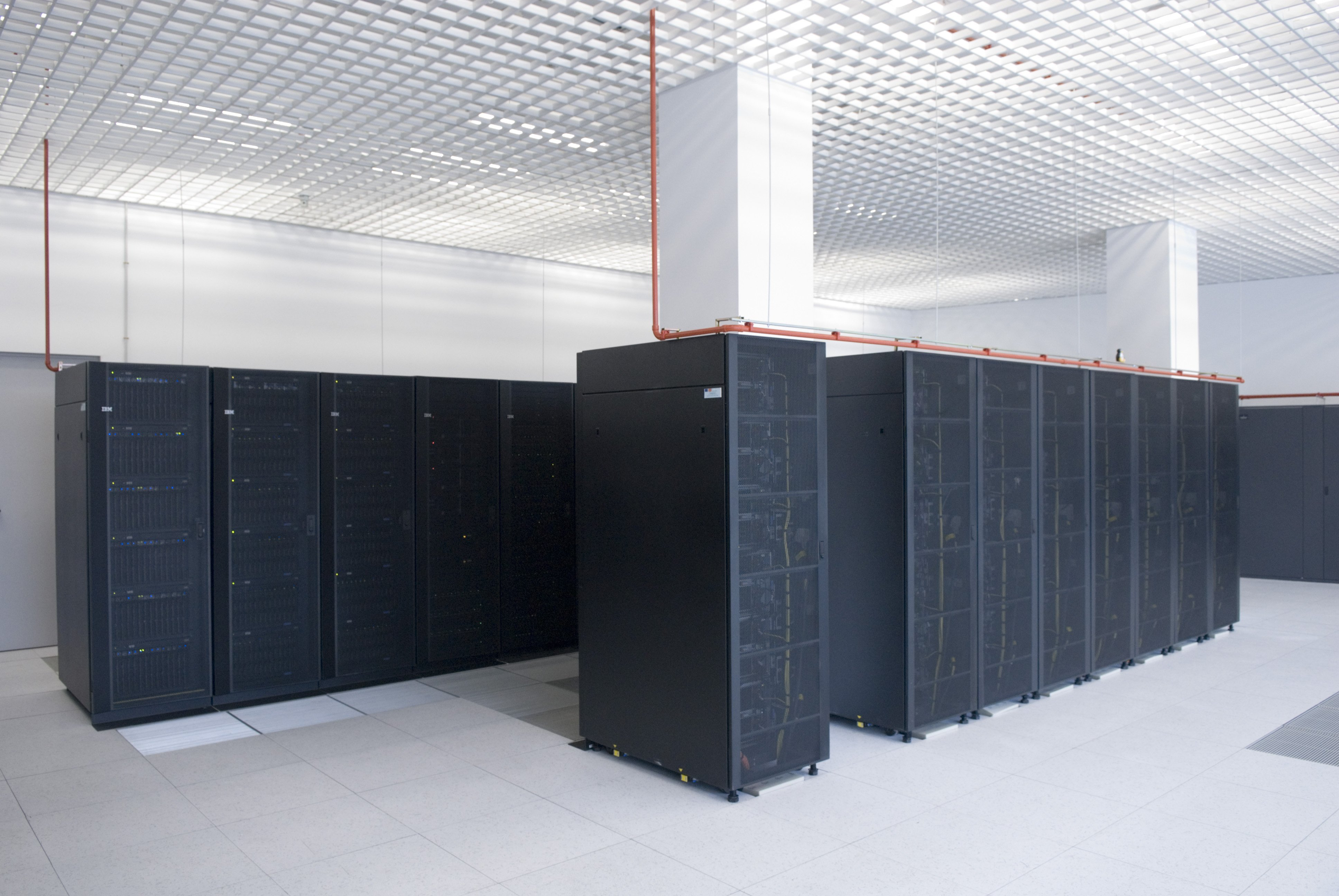
Magerit supercomputer (CeSViMa) has 86 Blade Centers (6 Blade Center E on each computing rack)

== History ==
Introduced in 2002, based on engineering work started in 1999, the IBM eServer BladeCenter was relatively late to the blade server market. It differed from prior offerings in that it offered a range of x86 Intel server processors and input/output (I/O) options.

The naming was changed to IBM BladeCenter in 2005. In February 2006, IBM introduced the BladeCenter H with switch capabilities for 10 Gigabit Ethernet and InfiniBand 4X.

A web site called Blade.org was available for the blade computing community through about 2009.

In 2012, the replacement Flex System was introduced.

== Enclosures ==
=== IBM BladeCenter (E) ===
The original IBM BladeCenter was later marketed as BladeCenter E. Power supplies have been upgraded through the life of the chassis from the original 1200 to 1400, 1800, 2000 and 2320 watt.

The BladeCenter (E) was co-developed by IBM and Intel and included:

- 14 blade slots in 7U
- Shared Media tray with Optical drive, floppy drive and USB 1.1 port
- 1 (upgradable to 2) Management modules
- Two slots for Gigabit Ethernet switches (can also have optical or copper pass-through)
- Two slots for optional switch or pass-through modules, can have additional Ethernet, Fibre Channel, InfiniBand or Myrinet 2000 functions
- Power: Two (upgradable to four) power supplies, C19/C20 connectors
- Two redundant high-speed blowers

==== IBM BladeCenter T ====
BladeCenter T is the telecommunications company version of the original BladeCenter, available with either AC or DC (48 V) power. Has 8 blade slots in 8U, but uses the same switches and blades as the regular BladeCenter E. To keep NEBS Level 3 / ETSI compliant special Network Equipment-Building System (NEBS) compliant blades are available.

=== IBM BladeCenter H ===
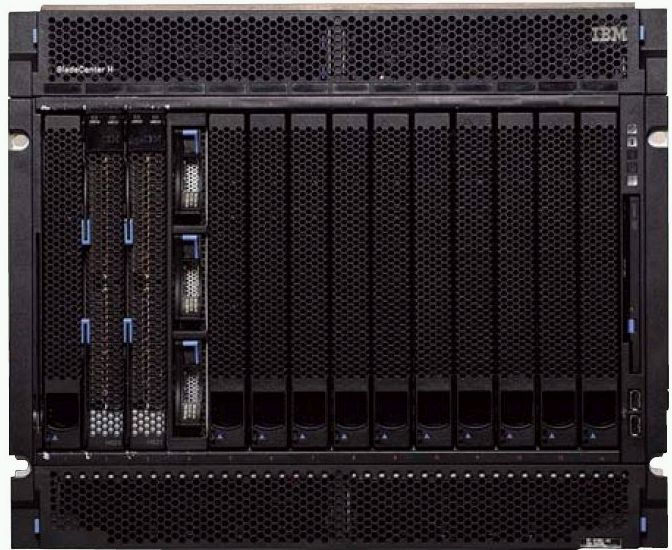
BladeCenter H

Upgraded BladeCenter design with high-speed fabric options, announced in 2006. Backwards compatible with older BladeCenter switches and blades. Features:

- 14 blade slots in 9U
- Shared Media tray with Optical drive and USB 2.0 port
- 1 (upgradable to 2) Advanced Management modules
- Two slots for Gigabit Ethernet switches (can also have optical or copper pass-through)
- Two slots for optional switch or pass-through modules, can have additional Ethernet, Fibre Channel, InfiniBand or Myrinet 2000 functions
- Four slots for optional high-speed switches or pass-through modules, can have 10 Gbit Ethernet or InfiniBand 4X.
- Optional Hard-wired serial port capability
- Power: Two (upgradable to four) power supplies, with Souriau UTG input connectors
- Two redundant high-speed blowers

==== IBM BladeCenter HT ====
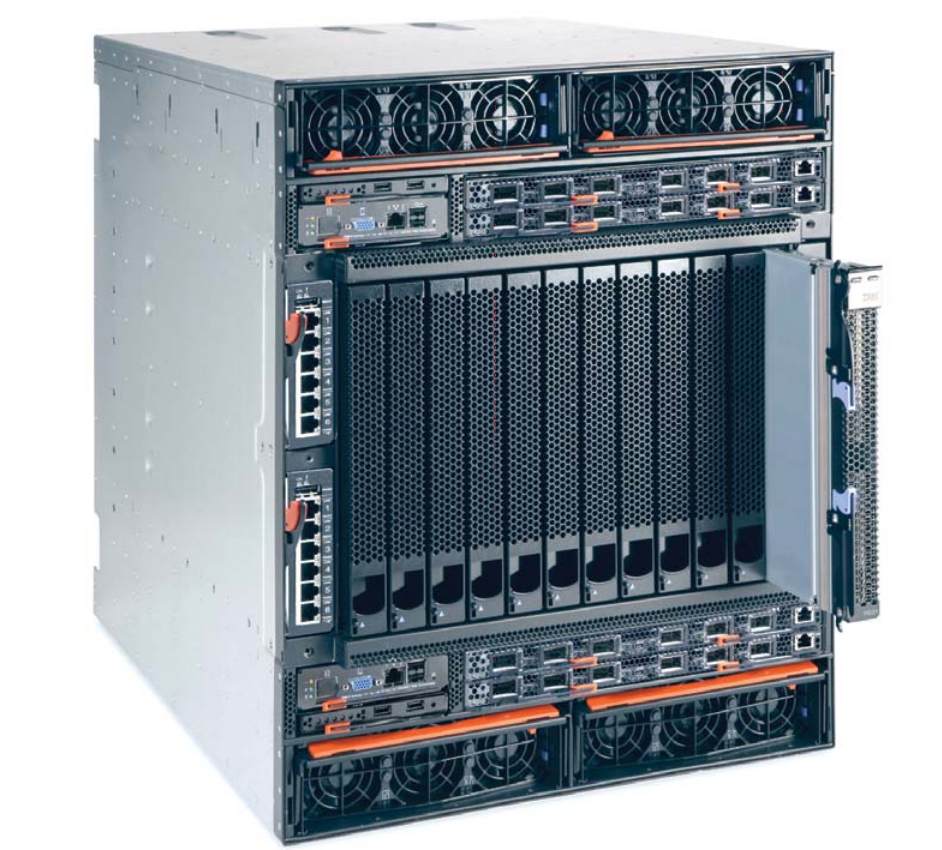
BladeCenter HT chassis

BladeCenter HT is the telecommunications company version of the BladeCenter H, available with either AC or DC (48 V) power. Has 12 blade slots in 12U, but uses the same switches and blades as the regular BladeCenter H. But to keep NEBS Level 3 / ETSI compliant special NEBS compliant blades are available.

=== IBM BladeCenter S ===
Targets mid-sized customers by offering storage inside the BladeCenter chassis, so no separate external storage needs to be purchased. It can also use 120 V power in the North American market, so it can be used outside the datacenter. When running at 120 V, the total chassis capacity is reduced. Features:

- 6 blade slots in 7U
- Shared Media tray with optical drive and 2× USB 2.0 ports
- 1 Advanced Management module as standard (no option for secondary module)
- Storage: Up to 12 hot-swap 3.5" (or 24 2.5") SAS or SATA drives with RAID 0, 1, and 1E capability (RAID 5 and SAN capabilities optional with two SAS RAID controllers)
  - Two optional Disk Storage Modules for HDDs, six 3.5" SAS/SATA drives each
- 4 hot-swap I/O switch module bays
- Power: Two 950/1450-watt, hot-swap modules and ability to have two optional 950/1450-watt modules, offering redundancy and power for robust configurations; C19/C20 connectors
- Four hot-swap redundant blowers (plus one fan in each power supply)

== Blade nodes list ==
IBM BladeCenter blade nodes list
| | | wide | sockets | 2002 | 2003 | 2004 | 2005 | 2006 | 2007 | 2008 | 2009 | 2010 | 2011 | 2012 |
|---|---|---|---|---|---|---|---|---|---|---|---|---|---|---|
| x86 | Intel | 2 | 1-4 | | | HS40 | | | | | | | | |
| x86 | Intel | 1(2) | 2(4) | | | | | | | | | HX5 | | |
| x86 | Intel | 1 | 1-2 | HS20 | | | | | HS21 | | HS22 | | | HS23 |
| x86 | Intel | 1 | 1 | | | | | | | HS12 | | | | |
| x86 | Intel | 1 | 1 | | | | | | | HC10 | | | | |
| x86 | AMD | 2 | 1-4 | | | | | LS41 | | LS42 | | | | |
| x86 | AMD | 1 | 1-2 | | | | LS20 | | LS21 | | | | | |
| P | POWER | 2 | 4 | | | | | | | | JS43 Exp | | | PS704 |
| P | POWER | 2 | 2 | | | | | | | | | | PS702 | |
| P | POWER | 1 | 2 | | | | | | JS22 | | JS23 | | | PS703 |
| P | POWER | 1 | 1 | | | | | | | JS12 | | | PS701 | |
| P | POWER | 1 | 1 | | | | | | | JS12 | | PS700 | | |
| P | PowerPC | 1 | 2 | | | JS20 | JS21 | | | | | | | |
| P | Cell | 2 | 2 | | | | | QS20 | | | | | | |
| P | Cell | 1 | 2 | | | | | | QS21 | QS22 | | | | |
| UltraSPARC | | | | | | | | | | 2BC | | | | |
| Network | | 1 | 1 | | | | | | | PN41 | | | | |

== Intel based ==
Modules based on x86 processors from Intel.

=== HS12 ===
(2008) Features:

- Processor: Celeron single-core 445 to quad-core Intel Xeon up to 2.83 GHz
- Memory: 6 DIMM slots (up to 24 GB)
- Hot-swap drives

=== HS20 ===
(2002–2006) Features:

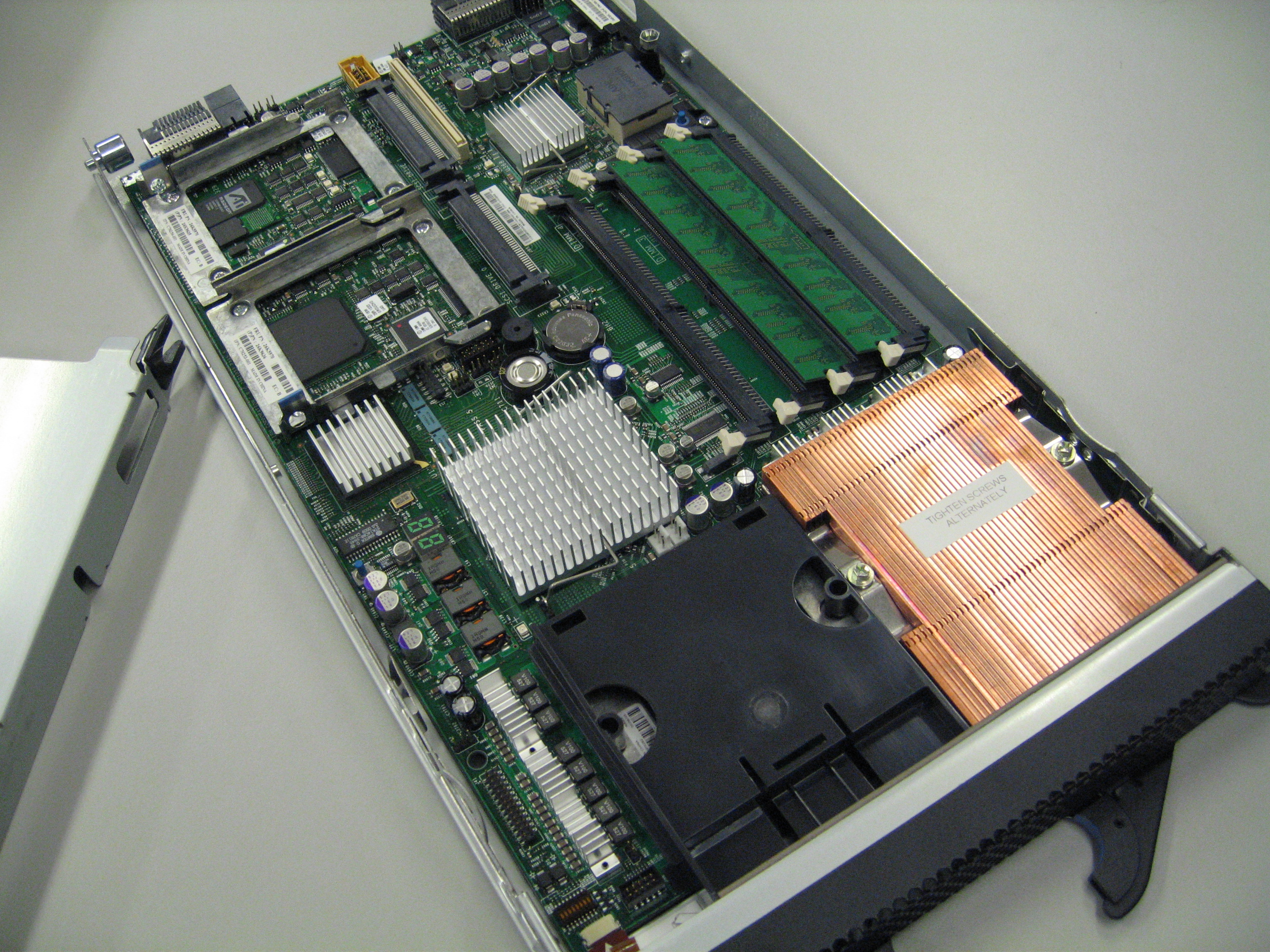
Inside of IBM HS20 blade. Two 2.5 inch disk drive bays are unoccupied.

- Processors: One or two Intel Xeon DP (single or dual-core)
- Memory: 4 DIMM slots
- Option for one or two 2.5" drives (ATA100, SCSI U320 or Serial Attached SCSI (SAS) depending on generation)
- Two 1 Gbit/s Ethernet ports
- One expansion slot for up to two additional ports (Fibre Channel storage, additional Ethernet, Myrinet 2000 or InfiniBand)

=== HS21 ===
(2007–2008) This model can use the High-speed IO option of the BladeCenter H, but is backwards-compatible with the regular BladeCenter. Features:

- Processors: One or two Intel Xeon DP (dual or quad-core)
- Memory: 4 DIMM slots
- Option for one or two SAS 2.5" drives
- Two 1 Gbit/s Ethernet ports
- One expansion slot for up to two additional ports (Fibre Channel storage, additional Ethernet, Myrinet 2000 or InfiniBand)
- One High-speed expansion slot for up to two additional ports (10 Gbit/s Ethernet or InfiniBand 4X)

=== HS21 XM ===
(2007–2008) This model can use the High-speed IO option of the BladeCenter H, but is backwards compatible with the regular BladeCenter. Features:

- Processors: One or two Intel Xeon DP (dual or quad-core)
- Memory: 8 DIMM slots
- Option for one SAS 2.5" drive or one or two SAS-based Solid State drives
- Two 1 Gbit/s Ethernet ports
- One expansion slot for up to two additional ports (Fibre Channel storage, additional Ethernet, Myrinet 2000 or InfiniBand)
- One High-speed expansion slot for up to two additional ports (10 Gbit/s Ethernet or InfiniBand 4X as well as additional Fibre-Channel or Ethernet ports)

=== HS22 ===
(2009–2011) Features:

- Processors: One or two Intel Xeon 5500 or 5600 series (up to 3.6 GHz 4-core or 3.46 GHz 6-core)
- Memory: up to 192 GB DDR3 (12 VLP DIMM slots)
- Option for two hot swap SAS 2.5" drives or SSD (RAID 0 and 1 are possible)
- Two 1 Gbit/s Ethernet ports (Broadcom 5709S)
- 1 CIOv slot (standard PCI-Express daughter card) and 1 CFFh slot (high-speed PCI-Express daughter card) for a total of 8 ports of I/O to each blade, including 4 ports of high-speed I/O
- Requires Advanced Management Module

=== HS22v ===
(2010–2011) Features are very similar to HS22 but:

- Memory: up to 288 GB DDR3 (18 VLP DIMM slots)
- Up to two 1.8" disks (SSD, not hot swapable)
- Requires Advanced Management Module

=== HS23 ===
(2012) Features:

- Single-wide
- Processors: One or two Intel Xeon E5-2600 or E5-2600 v2
- Memory: 16 DIMM slots, up to 1866 MHz
- 2 hot-swappable HDDs (SATA/SAS) or SSDs
- Dual 10G/1G Ethernet onboard expandable to 4 × 10
- Virtual Fabric / vNic's onboard
- Requires Advanced Management Module

=== HS23E ===
(2012) Features:

- Single-wide
- Processors: One or two Intel Xeon E5-2400
- Memory: 12 DIMM slots, up to 1600 MHz
- 2 hot-swappable HDDs (SATA/SAS) or SSDs
- Dual Gigabit Ethernet onboard ports with TOE
- Requires Advanced Management Module

=== HS40 ===
(2004) Features:

- Double-wide (needs 2 slots)
- Processors: One to four Intel Xeon MP
- Memory: (8 DIMM slots)
- Option for one or two ATA100 2.5" drives
- Four 1 Gbit/s Ethernet ports
- Two expansion slots for up to four additional ports (Fibre Channel storage, additional Ethernet, Myrinet 2000 or InfiniBand)

=== HC10 ===
(2008) This blade model is targeted to the workstation market, Features:

- Processor: Single Intel Core 2 Duo
- Memory: 8 GB max (4 DIMM slots)
- NVidia video adapter
- One SATA 60 GB HDD
- Two 1 Gbit/s Ethernet ports

=== HX5 ===
(2010–2011) This blade model is targeted at the server virtualization market. Features:

- Processors: 2 to 4 Intel E7, 6500 or 7500 series Xeon (4–10 cores per CPU, up to 2.67 GHz)
- Memory: 256 GB Max (16 DIMM slots); Expandable to 40 slots with a 24 DIMM MAX 5 memory blade (640 GB total).
- Two 1 Gbit/s Ethernet ports per blade

== AMD based ==
Modules based on x86 processors from AMD.

=== LS20 ===
(2005-2006) Features:

- Processors: One or two AMD Opteron (single or dual-core)
- Memory: DDR (4 VLP DIMM slots)
- Option for one or two SCSI U320 2.5" drives
- Two 1 Gbit/s Ethernet ports
- One expansion slot for up to two additional ports (Fibre Channel storage, additional Ethernet, Myrinet 2000 or InfiniBand)

=== LS21 ===
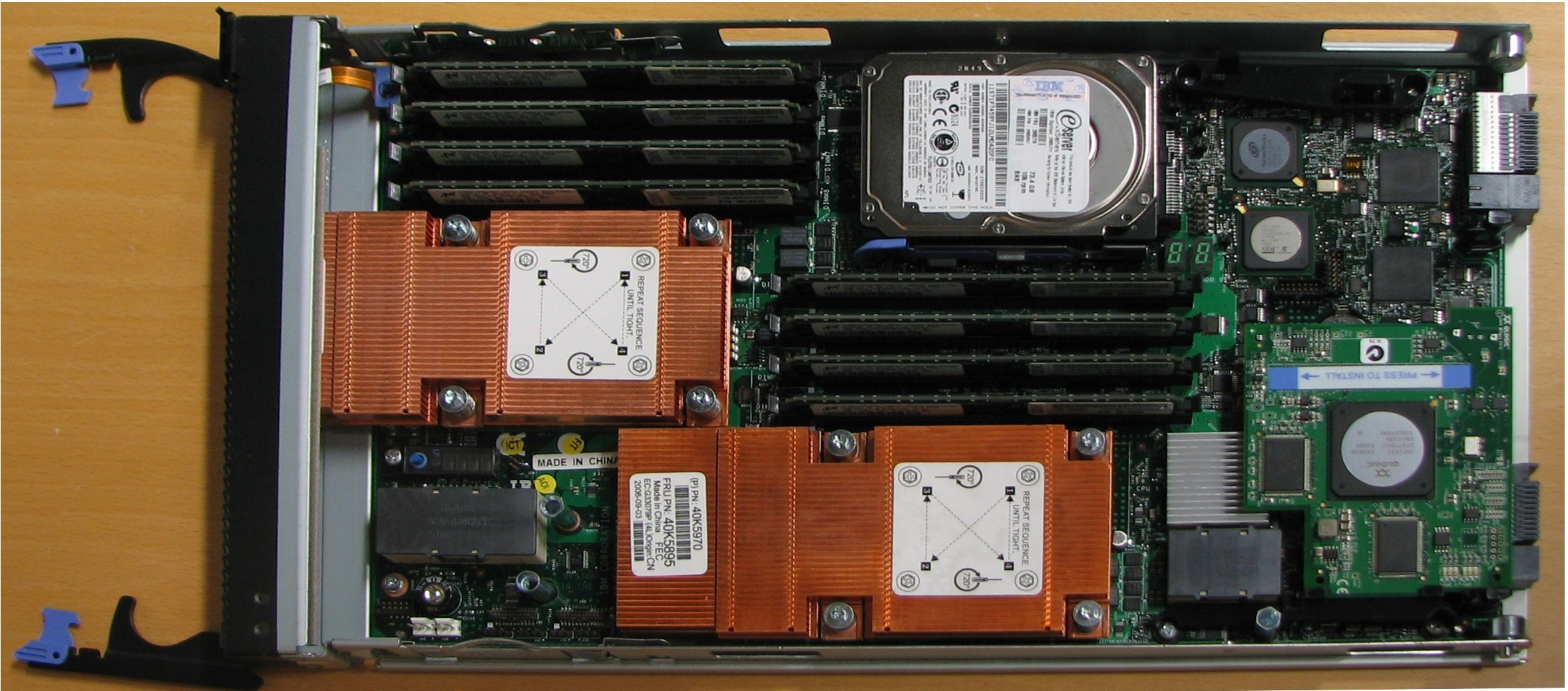
Inside of IBM LS21 blade. Small circuit board visible on the bottom right is an optional Fibre Channel daughter card.

(2006) This model can use the high-speed I/O of the BladeCenter H, but is also backwards compatible with the regular BladeCenter. Features:

- Processors: One or two AMD Opteron (dual-core), support 65 nm Quad core after BIOS update (tested)
- Memory: up to 32 GB of RAM (8 DIMM slots)
- Option for one SAS or SATA 2.5" drive
- Two Gigabit Ethernet ports
- One expansion slot for up to two additional ports (Fibre-Channel storage, additional Ethernet, Myrinet 2000 or InfiniBand)
- One High-speed expansion slot for up to two additional ports (10 Gbit/s Ethernet or InfiniBand 4X)

=== LS22 ===
(2008) Upgraded model of LS21. Features:

- Processors: One or two 45 nm AMD Opteron (quad or 6-core)
- Memory: up to 64 GB of RAM (8 DIMM slots)
- Option for two SAS or SATA 2.5" drive
- Two Gigabit Ethernet ports
- One expansion slot for up to two additional ports (Fibre-Channel storage, additional Ethernet, Myrinet 2000 or InfiniBand)
- One High-speed expansion slot for up to two additional ports (10 Gbit Ethernet or InfiniBand 4X)

=== LS41 ===
(2006–2007) This model can use the High-speed IO option of the BladeCenter H, but is backwards compatible with the regular BladeCenter. Features:

- Double-wide (needs 2 slots)
- Processors: One to four AMD Opteron (dual-core)
- Memory: up to 64 GB of RAM (16 DIMM slots)
- Option for one or two SAS 2.5" drives
- Four Gigabit Ethernet ports
- Two expansion slots for up to four additional ports (Fibre-Channel storage, additional Ethernet, Myrinet 2000 or InfiniBand)
- One High-speed expansion slot for up to two additional ports (10 Gbit/s Ethernet or InfiniBand 4X)
- Data Storage Capacity ?

=== LS42 ===
(2008–2009) Upgraded model of LS41. Features:

- Double-wide (needs 2 slots)
- Processors: One to 4 AMD Opteron (quad or 6-core)
- Memory: up to 128 GB of RAM (16 DIMM slots)
- Option for one or two SAS 2.5" drives
- Four Gigabit Ethernet ports
- Two expansion slots for up to four additional ports (Fibre-Channel storage, additional Ethernet, Myrinet 2000 or InfiniBand)
- One High-speed expansion slot for up to two additional ports (10 Gbit/s Ethernet or InfiniBand 4X)

== Power based ==
Modules based on PowerPC- or Power ISA-based processors from IBM.

=== JS20 ===
(2006) Features:

- Can run AIX or Linux
- Processors: Two PowerPC 970 at 1.6 or 2.2 GHz
- Memory: 4 DIMM slots for PC2700 ECC (max 8 GB)
- Option for one or two ATA100 2.5" drives
- Two Gigabit Ethernet ports
- One expansion slot for up to two additional ports (Fibre Channel storage, additional Ethernet, Myrinet 2000 or InfiniBand)

=== JS21 ===
(2006) This model can have the High-speed IO option of the BladeCenter H, but is backwards compatible with the regular BladeCenter. Features:

- Can run AIX or Linux
  - Can do virtualization, with Dynamic Logical Partitioning (DLPAR) capabilities
- Processors: Two PowerPC 970FX single-core at 2.7 GHz or two PowerPC 970MP dual-core at 2.5 GHz
- Memory: 4 DIMM slots for PC2-3200 or PC2-4200 ECC (max 16 GB)
- Option for one or two SAS 2.5" drives
- Two Gigabit Ethernet ports
- One expansion slot for up to two additional ports (Fibre Channel storage, additional Ethernet, Myrinet 2000 or InfiniBand)
- One High-speed expansion slot for up to two additional ports (10 Gbit Ethernet or InfiniBand 4X)

=== JS22 ===
(2009) Features:

- Can run IBM i, AIX or Linux
  - Supports virtualization, with Dynamic Logical Partitioning (DLPAR) and IBM Integrated Virtualization Manager (IVM)
- Processors: Two POWER6 dual-core at 4.0 GHz
- Memory: 4 DIMM slots ECC Chipkill DDR2 SDRAM (max 32 GB)
- One 2.5" SAS drive up to 146 GB
- Two Gigabit Ethernet ports card
- One expansion slot for up to two additional ports (Fibre Channel storage, additional Ethernet, Myrinet 2000 or InfiniBand)
- One High-speed expansion slot for up to two additional ports (10 Gbit Ethernet or InfiniBand 4X)

=== JS23 ===
(2009) Features:

- Can run IBM i, AIX or Linux
  - Supports virtualization, with Dynamic Logical Partitioning (DLPAR) and IBM Integrated Virtualization Manager (IVM)
- Processors: Two POWER6 dual-core at 4.2 GHz
  - 64 MB L3 cache (32 per processor)
- Memory: 4 DIMM slots ECC Chipkill DDR2 SDRAM (max 64 GB)
- One 2.5" SAS up to 300 GB or one SSD drive
- Two Gigabit Ethernet ports card
- One expansion slot for up to two additional ports (Fibre Channel storage, additional Ethernet, Myrinet 2000 or InfiniBand)
- One High-speed expansion slot for up to two additional ports (10 Gbit Ethernet or InfiniBand 4X)
- One CIOv PCIe expansion slot

=== JS43 Express ===
Features:

- Double-wide
- Can run IBM i, AIX or Linux
  - Supports virtualization, with Dynamic Logical Partitioning (DLPAR) and IBM Integrated Virtualization Manager (IVM)
- Processors: 4 POWER6 dual-core at 4.2 GHz
  - 128 MB L3 cache (32 per processor)
- Memory: 8 DIMM slots ECC Chipkill DDR2 SDRAM (max 128 GB)
- Up to two 2.5" SAS (up to 300 GB) or up to two SSD drives
- Two Gigabit Ethernet ports card
- One expansion slot for up to two additional ports (Fibre Channel storage, additional Ethernet, Myrinet 2000 or InfiniBand)
- One High-speed expansion slot for up to two additional ports (10 Gbit Ethernet or InfiniBand 4X)
- Two PCIe CIOv expansion slots

=== JS12 Express ===
Features:

- Can run IBM i, AIX or Linux
  - Supports virtualization, with Dynamic Logical Partitioning (DLPAR) and IBM Integrated Virtualization Manager (IVM)
- Processor: One POWER6 dual-core at 3.8 GHz
- Memory: 8 DIMM slots ECC Chipkill DDR2 SDRAM (max 64 GB)
- Zero to two 2.5" SAS drive up to 146 GB
- Two Gigabit Ethernet ports, with optionan dual Gbit card
- One expansion slot for up to two additional ports (Fibre-Channel storage, additional Ethernet, Myrinet 2000 or InfiniBand)
- One High-speed expansion slot for up to two additional ports (4 Gbit/s Fibre Channel, iSCSI, or InfiniBand 4X)

=== PS700 ===
Branded as part of IBM Power Systems. Features:

- Can run IBM i, AIX or Linux on Power
  - Can do virtualization, with Dynamic Logical Partitioning (DLPAR) capabilities.
- Processor: One POWER7 quad-core at 3 GHz
- Memory: max 64 GB
- Two Gigabit Ethernet ports, with optionan dual Gbit card

=== PS701 ===
Features are very similar to PS700, but

- Processor: 8-core
- Memory: max 128 GB

==== PS702 ====
Think two PS701 tied together back-to-back, forming a double-wide blade

=== PS703 ===
Features are very similar to PS701, but

- Processors: Two 8-core at 2.4 GHz

==== PS704 ====
Think two PS703 tied together back-to-back, forming a double-wide blade.

== Cell based ==
Modules based on Cell processors from IBM.

=== QS20 ===
Features:

- Double-wide (needs 2 slots)
- Can run Linux
- Processors: Two Cell processors at 3.2 GHz
- Memory: 1 GB XDRAM (512 MB per processor)
- 40 GB IDE100 2.5" drive
- Two Gigabit Ethernet ports
- Optional InfiniBand 4X connectivity

=== QS21 ===
Features:

- Single-wide
- Can run Linux
- Processors: Two Cell processors at 3.2 GHz
- Memory: 2 GB (1 GB per processor)
- Two Gigabit Ethernet ports
- One expansion slot for up to two additional ports (Fibre-Channel storage, additional Ethernet, Myrinet 2000 or InfiniBand)
- One High-speed expansion slot for up to two additional ports (10 Gbit Ethernet or InfiniBand 4X)

=== QS22 ===
Features:

- Single-wide
- Can run Linux
- Processors: Two PowerXCell 8i at 3.2 GHz
- Memory: Up to 32 GB of DDR2 SDRAM
- Two Gigabit Ethernet ports
- Expansion slots for SAS daughter card, InfiniBand 4X DDR daughter card and 8 GB uFDM Flash Drive

== UltraSPARC based: 2BC ==
Themis computer announced a blade around 2008. It ran the Sun Solaris operating system from Sun Microsystems. Each module had one UltraSPARC T2 with 64 threads at 1.2 GHz and up to 32 GB of DDR2 SDRAM processor memory.

== Advanced network: PN41 ==
Developed in conjunction with CloudShield, features:

- Single-wide
- Processor: Intel IXP2805 network processor
- Full payload screening with deep packet inspection (DPI)
- Full Layer 7 processing and control
- User programmability using Eclipse-based IDE and RAVE open development language
- Quad 1 Gbit + quad 10 Gbit Ethernet controllers
- Up to 20 Gbit/s DPI throughput per blade
- Selective traffic capture, rewrite and redirect
- Has LAN and WAN Interfaces

== Modules ==
=== Switch modules ===
The BladeCenter can have a total of four switch modules, but two of the switch module bays can take only an Ethernet switch or Ethernet pass-through. To use the other switch module bays, a daughtercard needs to be installed on each blade that needs it, to provide the required SAN, Ethernet, InfiniBand or Myrinet function. Mixing of different type daughtercards in the same BladeCenter chassis is not allowed.

==== Gigabit Ethernet ====
Gigabit Ethernet switch modules were produced by IBM, Nortel, and Cisco Systems. BLADE Network Technologies produced some switches, and later was purchased by IBM. In all cases speed internal to the BladeCenter, between the blades, is non-blocking. External Gigabit Ethernet ports vary from four to six and can be either copper or optical fiber.

==== Storage Area Network ====
A variety of SAN switch modules have been produced by QLogic, Cisco, McData (acquired by Brocade) and Brocade ranging in speeds of 1, 2, 4 and 8 Gbit Fibre Channel. Speed from the SAN switch to the blade is determined by the lowest-common-denominator between the blade HBA daughtercard and the SAN switch. External port counts vary from two to six, depending on the switch module.

==== InfiniBand ====
A InfiniBand switch module has been produced by Cisco. Speed from the blade InfiniBand daughtercard to the switch is limited to IB 1X (2.5 Gbit). Externally the switch has one IB 4X and one IB 12X port. The IB 12X port can be split to three IB 4X ports, giving a total of four IB 4X ports and a total theoretical external bandwidth of 40 Gbit.

==== Pass-through ====
Two kinds of pass-through module are available: copper pass-through and fibre pass-through. The copper pass-through can be used only with Ethernet, while the Fibre pass-through can be used for Ethernet, SAN or Myrinet.

==== Bridge ====
Bridge modules are only compatible with BladeCenter H and BladeCenter HT. They function like Ethernet or SAN switches and bridge the traffic to InfiniBand. The advantage is that from the Operating System on the blade everything seems normal (regular Ethernet or SAN connectivity), but inside the BladeCenter everything gets routed over the InfiniBand.

=== High-speed switch modules ===
High-speed switch modules are compatible only with the BladeCenter H and BladeCenter HT. A blade that needs the function must have a high-speed daughtercard installed. Different high-speed daughtercards cannot be mixed in the same BladeCenter chassis.

==== 10 Gigabit Ethernet ====
A 10 Gigabit Ethernet switch module was available from BLADE Network Technologies. This allowed 10 Gbit/s connection to each blade, and to outside the BladeCenter.

==== InfiniBand 4X ====
There are several InfiniBand options:

- A high-speed InfiniBand 4X SDR switch module from Cisco. This allows IB 4X connectivity to each blade. Externally the switch has two IB 4X ports and two IB 12X ports. The 12X ports can be split to three 4X ports, providing a total of eight IB 4X ports or a theoretical bandwidth of 80 Gbit. Internally between the blades, the switch is non-blocking.
- A High-speed InfiniBand pass-through module to directly connect the blades to an external InfiniBand switch. This pass-though module is compatible with both SDR and DDR InfiniBand speeds.
- A high-speed InfiniBand 4X QDR switch module from Voltaire (later acquired by Mellanox Technologies). This allows full IB 4X QDR connectivity to each blade. Externally the switch has 16 QSFP ports, all 4X QDR capable.

=== Roadrunner TriBlade (custom module) ===
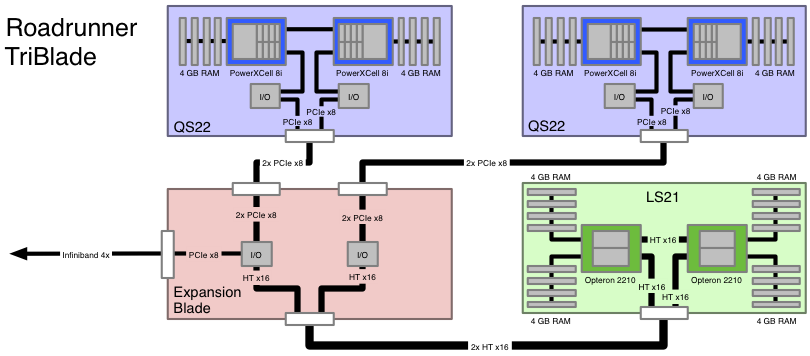
A schematic description of the TriBlade module

The IBM Roadrunner supercomputer used a custom module called the TriBlade from 2008 through 2013. An expansion blade connects two QS22 modules with 8 GB RAM each via 4 PCIe x8 links to a LS21 module with 16 GB RAM, two links for each QS22. It also provides outside connectivity via an Infiniband 4x DDR adapter. This makes a total width of four slots for a single TriBlade. Three TriBlades fit into one BladeCenter H chassis.

== See also ==
- BladeCenter Extension (zBX)
- Based on BladeCenter supercomputers:
  - The IBM Roadrunner was implemented with BladeCenter components from 2008 through 2013
  - All supercomputers of Spanish Supercomputing Network; This includes Magerit and MareNostrum (the two most powerful supercomputers of Spain) and 6 small supercomputers.
  - Ljubljana Supercomputing Center employs the BladeCenter
- Weta Digital uses BladeCenter to render The Lord of the Rings and other films
- Aquasar — watercooled BladeCenter prototype

IBM BladeCenter
2000 - 2012

| | eServer | - | |
| p Series: | - | JS/QS nodes 2004 | PS nodes 2009 |
| x Series: | x86 HS/HX/JS/JX nodes 2000 | | |

Succeeded by
IBM Flex System
Succeeded by
Lenovo Flex System
