= Mateo Valero =

Spanish computer architect

Mateo Cortés
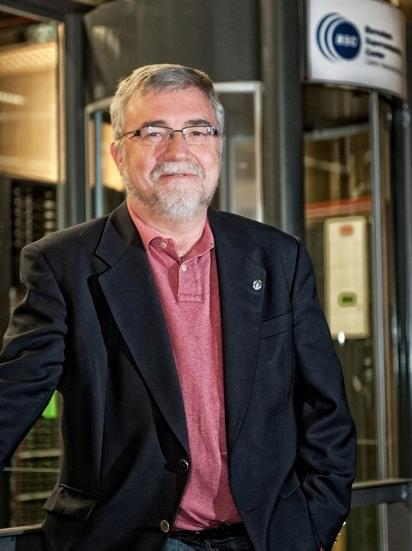
- Born: Mateo Valero Cortés; Spain
- Occupation: Computer architect
- Years active: 1990–present
- Organisation: Barcelona Supercomputing Center

Mateo Valero Cortés is a Spanish computer architect. His research encompasses different concepts within the field of computer architecture, a discipline in which he has published more than 700 papers in journals, conference proceedings, and books. Valero has received numerous awards, including the Eckert–Mauchly Award in 2007. As of 2024 he is the director of the Barcelona Supercomputing Center, which hosts the MareNostrum supercomputer.

== Early life and education ==
Mateo Valero Cortés is from Alfamén, Aragon, Spain. At a young age he went to Zaragoza and then Madrid to study, before settling permanently in Barcelona.

Valero graduated in telecommunications engineering from the Technical University of Madrid in 1974 and got his Ph.D. in telecommunications engineering from the Polytechnic University of Catalonia.

== Career ==
Valero has combined his academic work with establishing and managing centres for high-performance computing research and technology transfer to businesses.

- Between 1990 and 1995, he first established and then directed the Barcelona European Parallelism Centre (CEPBA, after its initials in Spanish) to carry out fundamental and applied research in parallel computing.
- From 1995 to 2000, he was the director of C4, the Catalan Computing and Communications Centre, coordinating activities carried out by CEPBA and the Catalan Supercomputing Centre (CESCA, after its initials in Catalan).
- From October 2000 until 2004, he was the director of CIRI, the CEPBA-IBM Research Institute on parallel computers.
- Since May 2004 he has been the founder and director of Barcelona Supercomputing Center, and as of 2024 remains director.

At these centres he has worked to drive forward different supercomputing networks both nationally and internationally, such as the Spanish Supercomputing Network (RES, after its initials in Spanish), the Partnership for Advanced Computing in Europe (PRACE) and the Latin American Supercomputing Network (RISC, after its initials in Spanish).

In 2013 he won a European Research Council Advanced Grant to carry out the RoMoL project on new techniques to build multicore chips and the supercomputers of the future.

== Recognition and honours ==
=== Individual awards ===
- 2024: Premio Innovación y Ciencia (Innovation and Science award) at the Premios Vanguardia
- 2020: AUTELSI 2020 annual award, organised by the Asociación Española de Usuarios de Telecomunicaciones y Sociedad de la Información (AUTELSI), which recognises excellence and contributions and commitment to information technology
- 2019: Cénits Award for Research Excellence, given by Extremadura Center for Research, Technological Innovation and Supercomputing to commemorate its 10th anniversary
- 2018: Mexican Order of the Aztec Eagle. This is the highest prize given by Mexican government to a non Mexican person.
- 2017: MareNostrum 4, chosen as the most beautiful data centre in the world. The award, organised by DCDnews, has been granted by popular vote.
- 2017: Charles Babbage Award (IEEE Computer Society), for "his contributions to parallel computation through brilliant technical work, mentoring PhD students, and building on incredibly productive European research environment"
- 2017: Recognition for his outstanding career in scientific and technological development, given by the University of Guadalajara in Mexico and by the national committee of the ISUM international congress.
- 2016: Creu de Sant Jordi award (Catalan Government)
- 2015: Seymour Cray Award (IEEE - Computer Society) for supercomputing "in recognition of seminal contributions to vector, out-of-order, multithreaded, and VLIW (Very Long Instruction Word) architectures"
- 2015: Innovative Businesses Forum Award in the Innovative Researcher category
- 2014: Award of Honour (Catalan Telecommunication Engineers Association)
- 2013: Association for Computing Machinery (ACM) Distinguished Service Award "for extraordinary leadership of initiatives in high-performance computing research and education"
- 2009: Goode Award (IEEE - Computer Society), for his contributions to vector, out-of-order, multithreaded, and VLIW architectures
- 2008: Featured in Hall of Fame (Innovate, Connect, Transform - ICT conference)
- 2007: Eckert–Mauchly Award (IEEE/ACM;), for "extraordinary leadership in building a world class computer architecture research center, for seminal contributions in the areas of vector computing and multithreading, and for pioneering basic new approaches to instruction-level parallelism" (the highest international honour in the field of computer architecture)
- 2006: National Research Award for contributions to scientific and technological progress in Catalonia (Catalan Foundation for Research and Innovation
- 2006: Leonardo Torres Quevedo Spanish National Research Award for engineering research (Spanish Ministry for Education and Science)
- 2005: Research Achievements Career Award (National Polytechnic Institute, Mexico)
- 2005: Aritmel National Award –Spanish IT Engineer (Spanish Scientific and IT Society)
- 2004: Engineer of the Year Award (Spanish Telecommunication Engineers Association)
- 2001: Julio Rey Pastor Spanish National Research Award in Mathematics, Information and Communication Technology (Spanish Ministry for Education and Science)
- 1997: Rey Jaime I Award for fundamental research (Rey Jaime I Awards Foundation)
- 1996: Salvà i Campillo Award (Catalan Telecommunication Engineers Association)
- 1994: Narcís Monturiol Award (Government of Catalonia)

=== Joint awards ===
- 2011: First national award for partnership between research centres and businesses, awarded to BSC and IBM for their long and fruitful research collaboration (Catalan Foundation for Research and Innovation).
- 2011 and 2015: Severo Ochoa Centre of Excellence Award given to Barcelona Supercomputing Center (Spanish Ministry of Science and Innovation)
- 1994: Barcelona City Award in Technology for the work of CEPBA (Barcelona City Council)
- 1992: Fundación Universidad-Empresa Award for the university department with the best European research projects (Fundación Universidad-Empresa)

=== Other recognition ===
Valero is a founding fellow of the Spanish Royal Academy of Engineering, fellow of the Barcelona Royal Academy of Sciences and Arts, fellow of Academia Europaea and corresponding member of the Spanish Royal Academy of Pure Sciences, Physics and Natural Sciences and of the Mexican Academy of Science.

In 2018 he was elected correspondent academic of the Academia de Ingeniería de México, honorary fellow of the Real Academia Europea de Doctores and fellow of the Academia de Gastronomía de Murcia.

He has been awarded honorary doctorates by Chalmers University of Technology, the University of Belgrade, the University of Las Palmas de Gran Canaria, the University of Veracruz, the University of Zaragoza, the Complutense University of Madrid, the University of Cantabria and the University of Granada.

He is also a fellow of the IEEE and ACM and an Intel Distinguished Fellow.

He is a member of the external Scientific Advisory Committee of the Universidad Complutense de Madrid and benefactor of the graduation of the 2018 promotion from Universidad San Jorge de Zaragoza.

As of 2017 he was a member of the committee for the IEEE Sidney Fernbach Award.

Valero maintains strong links with his home town, Alfamén, which has bestowed a variety of honours upon him. In 1998 he was chosen as the municipality's "Favourite Son" and in 2005 a local school was given the name CEIP Mateo Valero. Aragon has also recognised Valero with a number of honours, such as the Aragon Award – also known as the San Jorge Award – which is considered the most important awarded by the provincial government (2008), and the Special Award for Aragonese Research by the Asociación.

== Publications ==
Valero has published more than 700 papers in computing journals.
