= University of the Balearic Islands =

Spanish public university

Coordinates: 39.63805°N 2.64835°E

- Universitat de les Illes Balears; Universidad de las Islas Baleares
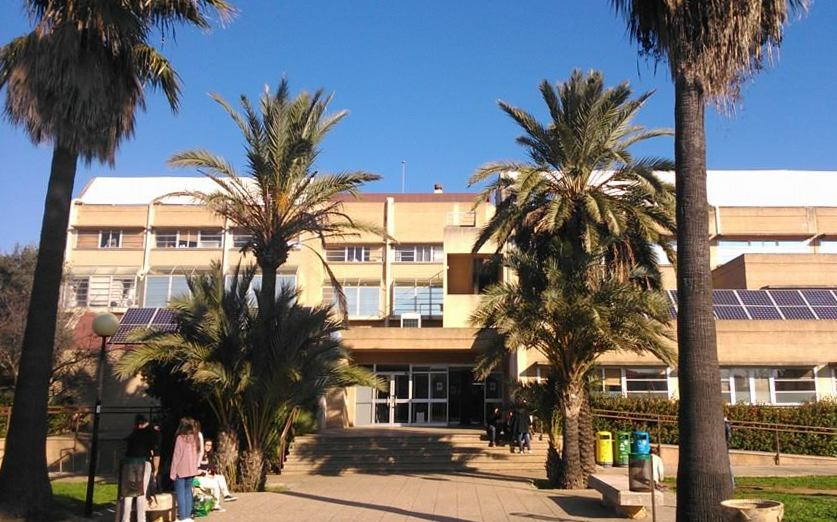
- Guillem Colom Casasnovas building
- Former name: University of Palma
- Type: State University
- Established: 1978
- Affiliations: Vives network
- Rector: Jaume Carot
- Students: 15,789 (2022–23)
- Undergraduates: 11,926 (2022–23)
- Postgraduates: 1,479 (2022–23)
- Doctoral students: 930 (2022–23)
- Other students: Researchers and PhD Investigators: 1,029 (2003–2004)
- Location: Palma, Balearic Islands, Spain
- Campus: Main campus outside Palma. Additional buildings in central Palma and on Ibiza and Menorca
- Language: Catalan; Spanish; English
- Website: uib.cat

University rankings

Global – Overall
- ARWU World: 601–700 (2023)
- THE World: 801–1000 (2024)
- USNWR Global: =554 (2023)

The University of the Balearic Islands (Catalan: Universitat de les Illes Balears [univəɾsiˈtad də ləz ˈiʎəz βəleˈas], UIB; Spanish: Universidad de las Islas Baleares) is a Balearic Spanish university, founded in 1978 and located in Palma on the island of Mallorca. The university is funded by the autonomous Government of the Balearic Islands.

== History ==
The origins of the university date back to 1483, when King Ferdinand II of Aragon authorized the foundation of the Estudi General Lul·lià in Palma de Mallorca. The college was named after the philosopher and writer Ramon Llull (c.1232–c.1315). It operated until 1835, when it was closed following intense debate.

After 1835, students from the Balearic Islands attended university in mainland Spain in Cervera and subsequently in Barcelona. There was no higher education institution in the Balearic Islands until 1949, when the Estudi General Lul·lià was reinstituted under the auspices of the University of Barcelona. This initially offered courses in philosophy and philology, which were recognized by the University of Barcelona. The faculties of Science and Arts were added in 1972 (attached to the Autonomous University of Barcelona and to the University of Barcelona respectively), followed by the Faculty of Law.

The faculties of the Estudi General Lul·lià were separated from their sponsoring universities in 1978, forming the University of Palma.

Work on a new campus began in 1983, on the road from Palma to Valldemossa. This was a controversial choice; there was an alternative location near to the original Faculty of Sciences in Palma. In 1998, additional sites were opened in Ibiza and in Alaior, Menorca. In 1985, the name was changed to the current University of the Balearic Islands. The Faculty of Tourism was added in 1993, the Faculty of Education in 1992, and the Faculty of Psychology and the Polytechnic School in 2000.

Since 1996, the university has been funded by the Government of the Balearic Islands.

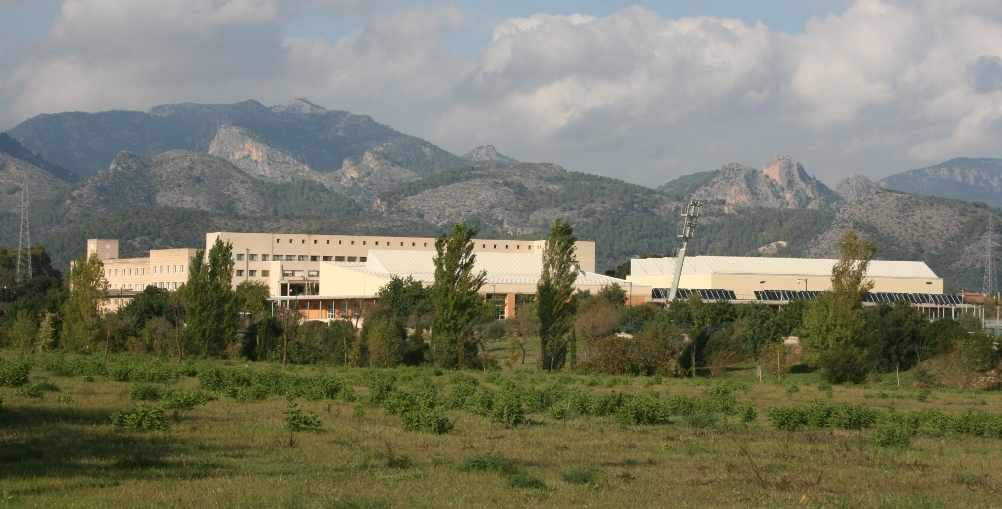
The sports campus with the Serra de Tramuntana mountains in the background

== Rectors ==
- Antoni Roig Muntaner: 1979-1981 (Professor of Physical Chemistry)
- Antoni Ribera i Blancafort: 1981-1982
- Nadal Batle i Nicolau: 1982-1995
- Llorenç Huguet: 1995-2003
- Avel·lí Blasco: 2003-2007 (Professor of Administrative Law)
- Montserrat Casas Ametller: 2007-2013 (Professor of Atomic, Molecular and Nuclear Physics)
- Llorenç Huguet: 2013-2021 (Professor of Computational Sciences)
- Jaume Carot: 2021-

== Campus ==
Construction of the UIB campus began in 1983 on private land located next to the Valldemossa road, between the former possessions of Ca's Jai and Son Lledó, in the municipality of Palma. This decision led to the separation of the university from the city. For a long time, the only way to access the campus was by car or by the EMT bus service from Palma. The road was later improved, speeding up traffic coming from the capital and providing a pedestrian and bicycle lane. In 2005, work began on a Metro line to the train station in central Palma. The metro was operational in April 2007 and was the first line of its kind in the Balearic Islands.

The campus has been fully operational since 1993. In that year, all Palma urban area studies were centralized at the University of the Balearic Islands. Currently all the administrative services and faculties are located on the campus, although the Sa Riera building in Palma still remains. Buildings on the campus are named after important figures in Balearic society including Ramon Llull, Mathieu Orfila, Guillem Colom, Anselm Turmeda, Beatriu de Pinós, Guillem Cifre de Colonya, Gaspar Melchor de Jovellanos and Arxiduc Lluís Salvador.

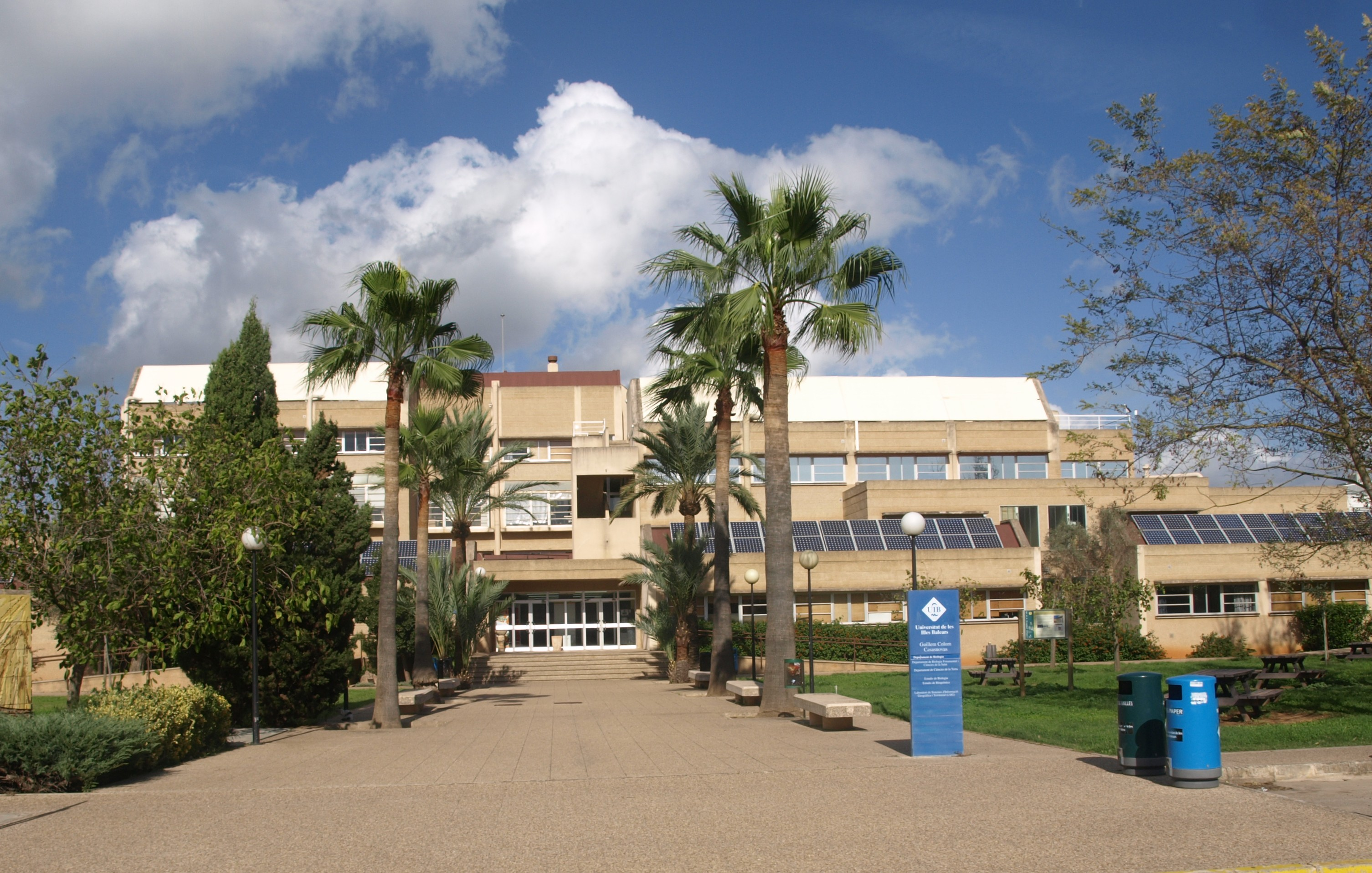
Guillem Colom

The university also has campuses in Ibiza and in Alaior, Menorca. These locations offer courses in Business Administration and Management, Law, Nursing, Education and Tourism.

== Rapid transit line ==
The university campus is connected with the city center through the Palma metro line M1 and the bus line 19.

The UIB metro station was inaugurated on April 25, 2007, but was closed later that year due to structural problems caused by flooding. Now it operates with trains every 15 minutes.

== Faculties and schools ==
- Faculty of Economics and Enterprise, studies administration, business management and economics.
- Faculty of Education, studies teaching (all specialities), social education, education and psychopedagogy.
- Faculty of Law
- Faculty of Medicine
- Faculty of Nursing and Physiotherapy
- Faculty of Philosophy and Art, studies: philosophy, English philology, Catalan philology, Hispanic philology, geography, history, art history and social work.
- Faculty of Psychology
- Faculty of Science, studies biology, biochemistry, physics, chemistry, agricultural engineering, speciality hortofructiculture and gardening.
- Faculty of Tourism
- Higher Polytechnic School, studies technical architecture, computer engineering, technical engineering computer systems, technical engineering computing management, telecommunications engineering, speciality telematics, industrial engineering, speciality industrial electronics and mathematics.

The faculties and schools are divided into autonomous departments, which are divided into subject areas. Each faculty is headed by a dean and each department by a director.

Also on the campus are the Institute of Educational Sciences, for teacher training, the Cultural Activities Service, which organizes the Open University, a student residence (Bartomeu Rosselló-Pòrcel), and a restaurant.

The UIB also has University Schools Adscritas, private establishments offering university degrees recognized by the University of the Balearic Islands (which are valid throughout Spain). The University Schools Adscritas are:

- University School Alberta Giménez. Studies teaching (all specialties), Communications and journalism.
- University School of Industrial Relations. Studies industrial relations.
- University School of Tourism's Island Council of Ibiza and Formentera. Studies tourism.
- University School of Tourism Felipe Moreno. Studies tourism.

== Links with other universities ==
The UIB belongs to the Xarxa Vives d'Universitats and Grupo 9 networks of universities. It has signed cooperation agreements with most Spanish universities and with research centers in Europe, America, Africa, and Asia. Students from the United Kingdom and United States can study at the UIB under the International Student Exchange Program.

== Languages ==
The working languages of the UIB are Catalan, Spanish, and English.

== Notable professors ==
- José María Baldasano, chemical and environmental engineer; interim professor of Chemical Engineering in the Faculty of Science from 1984 to 1986.
- Camilo José Cela Conde, anthropologist and philosopher of biology; full professor at the UIB since 1999 and director of its Human Systematics Laboratory.
- Carles Manera Erbina, economic historian; full professor of Economic History and Institutions since 2000, Balearic minister of Economy, Finance and Innovation from 2007 to 2011, and member of the Governing Council of the Bank of Spain.
- Alicia Sintes, theoretical physicist; leads the UIB's participation in the LIGO Scientific Collaboration.

== Notable students ==
- Francesc Antich Oliver (born 1958), former president of the Government of the Balearic Islands.
- Patricia de las Heras Fernandez (born 1988), politician
- Alejandra Forlán (born 1974), Uruguayan psychologist, lecturer, and activist.
- Cristòfol Soler i Cladera (born 1956), former president of the Government of the Balearic Islands.
- Antumi Toasijé (born 1969), historian.

== See also ==
- Vives Network
- List of medieval universities
- List of universities in Spain
- Palma
