= Patricia de las Heras Fernandez =

Spanish politician

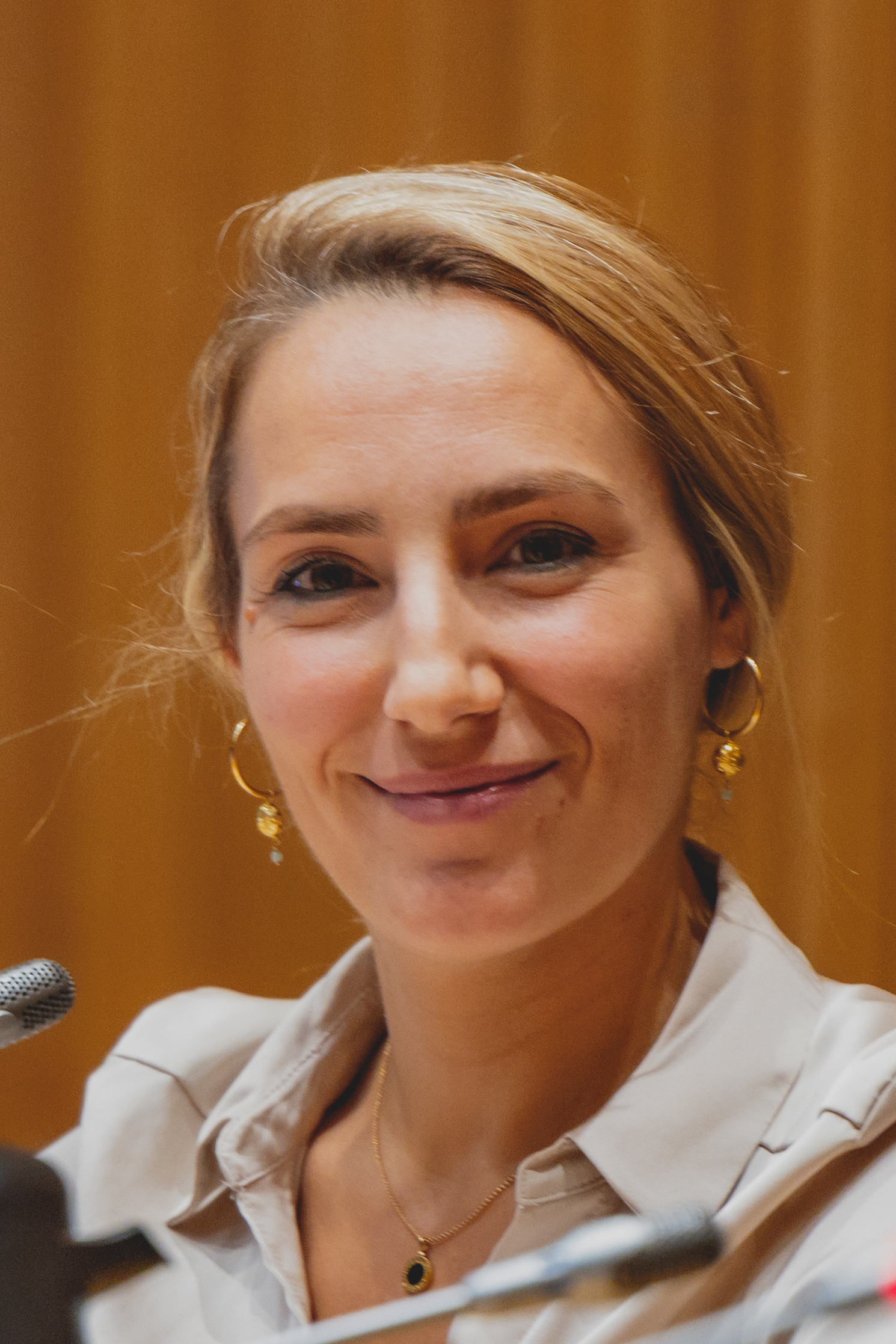

Member of the Congress of Deputies
- Incumbent
- Assumed office 10 November 2019
- Constituency: Balearic Islands

Personal details
- Born: 15 June 1988 (age 38) Balearic Islands, Spain
- Party: Vox (2019-present); People's Party (before 2019)
- Education: University of the Balearic Islands

Patricia de las Heras Fernandez (born 15 June 1988) is a Spanish politician and a member of the Congress of Deputies since November 2019 for the Vox party. She represents the Balearic Islands constituency.

Fernandez worked in banking before completing a law degree from University of the Balearic Islands and worked in law related to property and spatial planning. She was a member of the People's Party before joining Vox. In parliament she sits on the committee for urban planning and infrastructure.
