= Barcelona Supercomputing Center =

Research and supercomputing facility

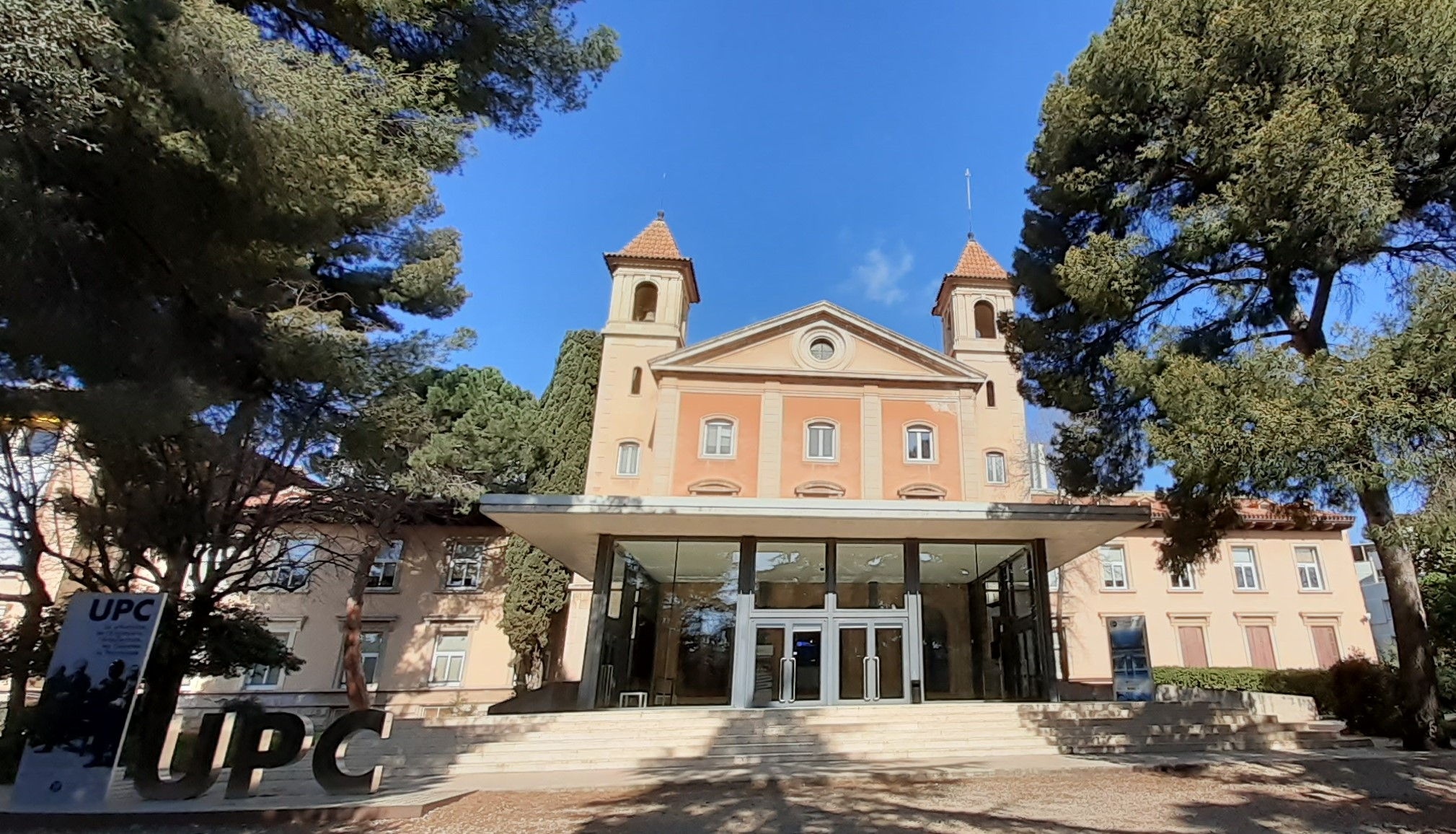
- Location: Barcelona, Spain
- Coordinates: 41°23′22″N 2°6′58″E
- Interactive map of Barcelona Supercomputing Center
- Website: https://www.bsc.es/

The Barcelona Supercomputing Center (Spanish: Centro Nacional de Supercomputación) is a public research center located in Barcelona, Catalonia, Spain. It hosts MareNostrum, a 13.7 Petaflops, Intel Xeon Platinum-based supercomputer, which also includes clusters of emerging technologies. In June 2017, it ranked 13th in the world. As of November 2022, it dropped to 88th. It is expected to host one of Europe's first quantum computers.

== Location and management ==
The Center is located in a former chapel named Torre Girona, at the Polytechnic University of Catalonia (UPC), and was established on April 1, 2005. It is managed by a consortium composed of the Spanish Ministry of Science and Innovation (60%), the Government of Catalonia (30%) and the UPC (10%). Professor Mateo Valero is its main administrator. The MareNostrum supercomputer is contained inside an enormous glass box in a former chapel.

The Earth Sciences Department was founded by chemical engineer José María Baldasano, who directed it until 2014. Research in the department has included air quality modelling, such as the CALIOPE project, which forecasts air pollution across Spain.

== Budget ==
The Barcelona Supercomputing Center had an initial operational budget of €5.5 million/year (about US$7 million/year) to cover the period of 2005–2011. The center has had a very rapid growth and in 2018 had a workforce of around 600 workers and an annual global budget of more than 34 million euros.

The Center has contributed to the development of the IBM cell microprocessor architecture.

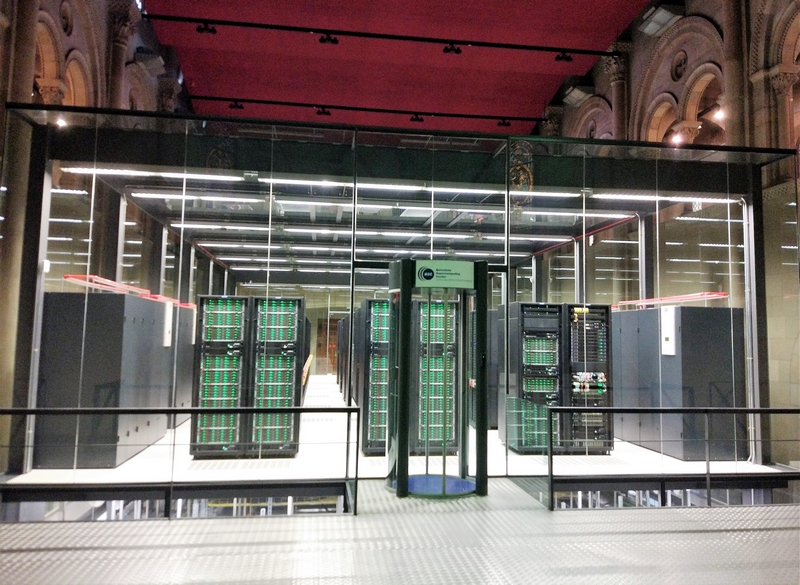
MareNostrum 4 supercomputer at Barcelona Supercomputing Center (2017)

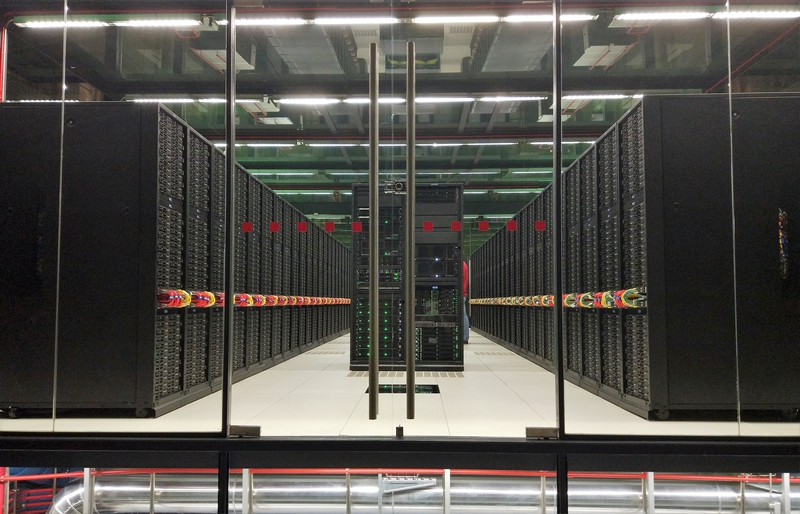
MareNostrum 4 supercomputer at Barcelona Supercomputing Center (2017)

== Staff ==
- Director: Mateo Valero
- Associate director: Josep Maria Martorell
- Computer Sciences director: Jesús Labarta
- Computer Sciences associate director: Eduard Ayguadé
- Life Sciences director: Alfonso Valencia
- Earth Sciences director:
- Computer Applications for Science and Engineering director: José María Cela
- Operations director: Sergi Girona

== In popular culture ==
The Barcelona Supercomputing Center appears in Dan Brown's 2017 science fiction mystery thriller novel Origin, as the home of the E-Wave device.
