= José María Baldasano =

Spanish chemical engineer and academic

- Born: José María Baldasano Recio; 17 April 1950 (age 76); Madrid, Spain
- Education: University of Barcelona; Institut National Polytechnique de Toulouse; Université de Sherbrooke
- Awards: Rei Jaume I Award for Environmental Protection (1997)
- Scientific career
- Fields: Environmental engineering, air quality, climate change, waste management
- Workplaces: Polytechnic University of Catalonia; Barcelona Supercomputing Center

José María Baldasano Recio (born 17 April 1950) is a Spanish chemical engineer and researcher. He is professor emeritus of environmental engineering at the Polytechnic University of Catalonia (UPC). His research has covered air quality and climate change modelling, water quality, waste management and environmental impact studies.

Baldasano was the founding director of the Earth Sciences Department at the Barcelona Supercomputing Center (BSC), from 2005 to 2014. Since 1999 he has been a member of the IPCC Task Force on National Greenhouse Gas Inventories. In 2025 he published a history of climate change denial.

== Early life and education ==
Baldasano was born in Madrid on 17 April 1950. He studied chemistry at the University of Barcelona, graduating in 1973 and completing a doctorate in 1983. Abroad, he qualified as a chemical engineer at the Institut National Polytechnique de Toulouse in 1976 and took a master's degree in chemical engineering at the Université de Sherbrooke, Canada, in 1979.

== Career ==
Baldasano worked in industry and in the Catalan regional administration before moving into academia at 34. He taught first at the University of the Balearic Islands and then at the UPC. At the UPC he directed the Institute of Applied Petrochemistry (1988–1991), the Institute of Environmental Technology and Modelling (1992–1997) and the Department of Engineering Projects (2001–2005). He also founded the UPC's doctoral programme in environmental engineering, which he coordinated from 1986 to 2006, and co-directed its master's programme in environmental engineering from 2006 to 2011.

In 2026, Baldasano was included in the career-long citation impact list of the Stanford–Elsevier World's Top 2% Scientists database.

=== Barcelona Supercomputing Center ===
Spain's Ministry of Education and Science, the Generalitat de Catalunya and the UPC created the BSC in 2005. Baldasano set up its Earth Sciences Department and led it until 2014. The department developed CALIOPE, an air quality forecasting system for Spain, and contributed to the EC-Earth climate model.

With the State Meteorological Agency (AEMET), Baldasano promoted the Barcelona Dust Regional Center for mineral dust forecasting, based on a 2007 agreement between AEMET and the BSC. In 2013 the World Meteorological Organization placed its regional specialised centre for sand and dust storm forecasting in Barcelona. It has operated since 2014.

=== Advisory roles ===
Baldasano has worked with the Intergovernmental Panel on Climate Change (IPCC) as an expert, and has belonged to its Task Force on National Greenhouse Gas Inventories since 1999. He has also been a consultant to the United Nations Environment Programme and the World Bank, and sat on the Scientific Steering Committee of PRACE, the European high-performance computing initiative, from 2010 to 2012.

In Catalonia, he drafted industrial waste legislation for the regional government between 1981 and 1984. He advised the Catalan Waste Agency from 2004 to 2010. In 2011 he joined the independent expert committee overseeing the Generalitat's 2011–2015 air quality plan.

=== Science communication ===
His book Dos grados más no son para tanto. Una historia del negacionismo climático ('Two more degrees is no big deal: a history of climate denial') was published by Ediciones Cátedra in October 2025. It was presented at the Ateneu Barcelonès, the Ateneo de Madrid and the Valencian Council of Culture. In December 2025 he spoke to La Razón about the role of climate change in the 2024 Valencia floods, and to the EFE news agency about climate policy and denialism.

== Awards and honours ==
- 1984: Ciutat de Palma Award, research category
- 1997: Rei Jaume I Award for Environmental Protection, for work on waste treatment
- 2007: IPCC diploma for his contribution to the panel's work, recognised that year with the Nobel Peace Prize
- 2019: Full member of the Royal European Academy of Doctors, admitted on 16 July

== Selected works ==
=== Books ===
- Power, H.; Baldasano, J. M., eds. (1998). Air Pollution Emissions Inventory. Advances in Air Pollution, vol. 3. Southampton: Computational Mechanics Publications. ISBN 978-1-85312-517-1.
- Baldasano, José M. (coordinator); Plana, Joan; Gonçalves, María; Jiménez, Pedro; Jorba, Oriol; López, Eugeni (2007). Mejora de la calidad del aire por cambio de combustible a gas natural en automoción: aplicación a Madrid y Barcelona. Barcelona: Fundación Gas Natural. ISBN 978-84-611-8540-5.
- Parra Narváez, René; Baldasano, José María (2011). Emisión de contaminantes del aire para modelos fotoquímicos. Editorial Académica Española. ISBN 978-3-8454-9137-0.
- Baldasano, José María (2019). El actual cambio climático: una visión holística de la crisis climática. Barcelona: Real Academia Europea de Doctores. ISBN 978-84-09-13018-4.
- Baldasano, José María (2025). Dos grados más no son para tanto. Una historia del negacionismo climático. Madrid: Ediciones Cátedra. ISBN 978-84-376-4943-6.

=== Edited proceedings and technical reports ===
- Pérez, C.; Baldasano, J. M., eds. (2009). WMO/GEO Expert Meeting on an International Sand and Dust Storm Warning System. IOP Conference Series: Earth and Environmental Science, vol. 7.
- Cuvelier, C.; et al. (2013). ScaleDep: Performance of European chemistry-transport models as function of horizontal spatial resolution. EMEP MSC-W Technical Report 1/2013. Co-authored by J. M. Baldasano.
- Baklanov, A.; Baldasano, J. M.; et al. (2016). Coupled Chemistry-Meteorology/Climate Modelling (CCMM): Status and relevance for numerical weather prediction, atmospheric pollution and climate research. Geneva: World Meteorological Organization. GAW Report No. 226; WWRP 2016-1; WCRP Report No. 9/2016; WMO-No. 1172. ISBN 978-92-63-11172-2.
