= MareNostrum =

Supercomputer in the Barcelona Supercomputing Center

Coordinates: 41°23.364′N 2°6.9661′E

MareNostrum 4
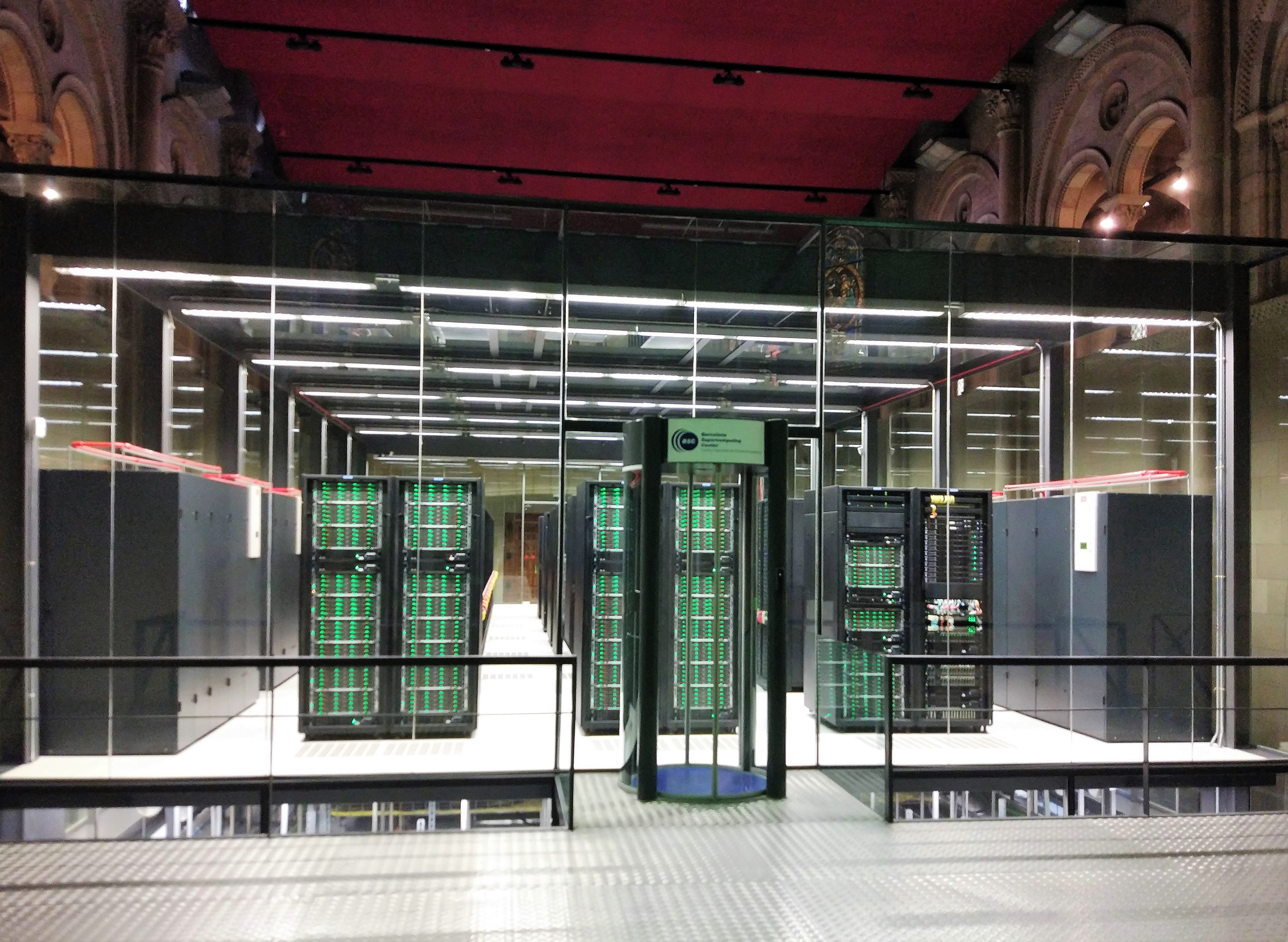
- The MareNostrum 4 supercomputer (2017)
- Active: Operational 2023
- Location: Barcelona Supercomputing Center
- Architecture: Bull Sequana XH3000 and Lenovo ThinkSystem architectures using Intel Sapphire Rapids, Nvidia Grace (ARM) CPUs and Nvidia Hopper GPUs
- Power: 1.3 MW
- Operating system: Red Hat Enterprise Linux
- Memory: 1.6 PB
- Storage: 248 PB
- Speed: 314 PFlops
- Cost: €34 million
- Ranking: TOP500: 30, November 2019
- Website: https://www.bsc.es/marenostrum/marenostrum-5

MareNostrum (Catalan: [ˌmaɾeˈnɔstɾum], Spanish: [ˌmaɾeˈnostɾum]) is the main supercomputer in the Barcelona Supercomputing Center. It is the most powerful supercomputer in Spain, one of thirteen supercomputers in the Spanish Supercomputing Network and one of the seven supercomputers of the European infrastructure PRACE (Partnership for Advanced Computing in Europe).

MareNostrum runs Red Hat Enterprise Linux. It occupies 180 m^{2} (less than half a basketball court).

The supercomputer is used in human genome research, protein research, astrophysical simulations, weather forecasting, geological or geophysical modeling, and the design of new drugs. It was booted up for the first time on 12 April 2005, and is available to the national and international scientific community.

Mare Nostrum ("our sea") was the Roman name for the Mediterranean Sea. The supercomputer is housed in the deconsecrated Chapel Torre Girona at the Polytechnic University of Catalonia, Barcelona, Spain.

== MareNostrum 5 ==
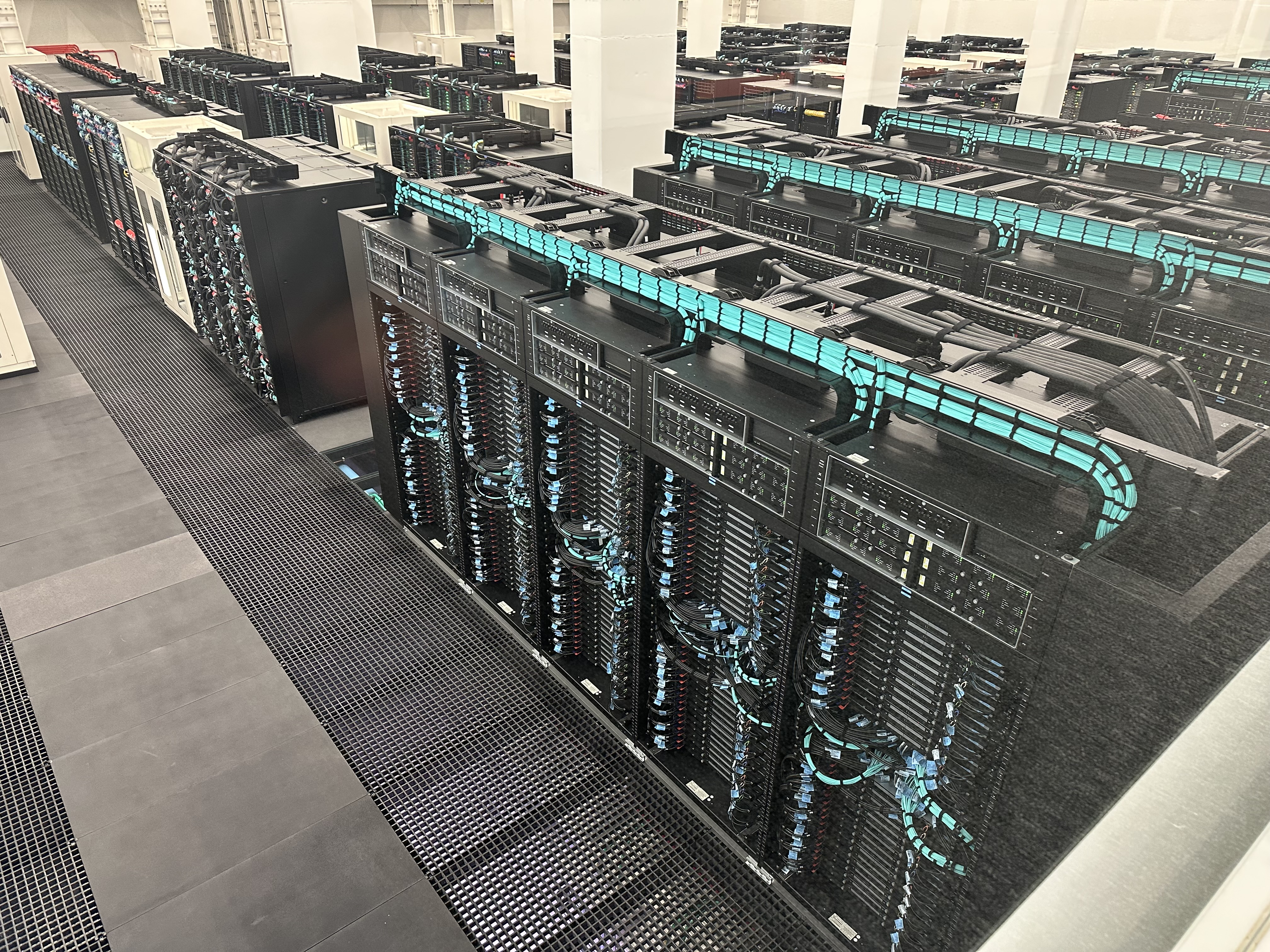
MareNostrum 5 in July 2025

In July 2019, the EuroHPC Joint Undertaking selected the Barcelona Supercomputing Center as one of the entities that will host a pre-exascale supercomputer in the high-capacity supercomputer network promoted by the European Commission. It was expected that MareNostrum 5 became operational on December 31, 2020, but its deployment got delayed until December 2023. It will include an experimental platform dedicated to testing and developing European supercomputing technologies. Among other changes MareNostrum 5 is based on Red Hat Enterprise Linux operating system.

== MareNostrum 4 ==
MareNostrum 4 has been dubbed the most diverse and likely the most interesting supercomputer in the world thanks to the heterogeneity of the architecture it will include once the installation of the supercomputer is complete. Its total speed will be 13.7 petaflops. It has five storage racks with the capacity to store 14 petabytes (14 million gigabytes) of data. A high-speed Omni-Path network connects all the components in the supercomputer to one another.

The supercomputer includes two separate parts: a general-purpose block and a block featuring emerging technologies.

The general-purpose block has 48 racks with 3,456 Lenovo ThinkSystem SD530 compute nodes. Each node has two Intel Xeon Platinum chips, each with 24 processors, amounting to a total of 165,888 processors and main memory of 390 terabytes. Its peak performance is 11.15 petaflops. While its performance is 10 times greater than its predecessor, MareNostrum 3, its electricity consumption only increased by 30% to 1.3 MW.

The block of emerging technologies is formed of clusters of three different technologies, which will be incorporated and updated as they become available on the market. These technologies are currently being developed in the United States and Japan to speed up the arrival of the new generation of pre-exascale supercomputers. They are as follows:

- Cluster comprising IBM POWER9 and NVIDIA Volta GPUs, with a computational capacity of over 1.5 petaflops. IBM and NVIDIA will use these processors for the Summit and Sierra supercomputers that the US Department of Energy has ordered for its Oak Ridge and Lawrence Livermore National Laboratories.
- Cluster made up of AMD Rome processors and AMD Radeon Instinct MI50. The machine will have a processor and accelerator similar to the Frontier supercomputer that will be installed in 2021 at ORNL. The computing power of the machine will be 0.52 Petaflop/s.
- Cluster formed of 64-bit ARMv8 processors in a prototype machine, using state-of-the-art technologies from the Japanese Post-K supercomputer. Computing power over 0.65 Petaflop/s.

The aim of gradually incorporating these emerging technologies into MareNostrum 4 is to allow BSC to experiment with what are expected to be the most advanced technological developments over the next few years and evaluate their suitability for future iterations of MareNostrum.

MareNostrum 4 has a disk storage capacity of 14 petabytes and is connected to BSC's big data facilities, which have a total capacity of 24.6 petabytes. Like its predecessors, MareNostrum 4 will also be connected to European research centres and European universities via the RedIRIS and GÉANT networks.

== MareNostrum 3 ==
The previous version, MareNostrum 3, consisted of 3,056 IBM iDataPlex DX360M4 compute nodes, for a total of 48,896 physical Intel Sandy Bridge cores running at 2.6 GHz, and 84 Xeon Phi 5110P in 42 nodes. MareNostrum 3 had 36 racks dedicated to calculations. In total, each rack had 1,344 cores and 2,688 GB of memory. Each IBM iDataPlex Compute rack was composed of 84 IBM iDataPlex dx360 M4 compute nodes and four Mellanox 36-port Managed FDR10 IB Switches. dx360 M4 compute nodes were grouped into a 2U Chassis, having two columns of 42 2U chassis.

The computing nodes of MareNostrum 3 communicated primarily through a high bandwidth, low latency InfiniBand FDR10 network. The different nodes were interconnected via fibre optic cables and Mellanox 648-port FDR10 Infiniband Core Switches. In addition, there was a more traditional local area network consisting of Gigabit Ethernet adapters.

== MareNostrum 2 ==
This older version has been based on a 2,560 IBM BladeCenter JS21 nodes with PowerPC 970MP processors and with 20 TB system memory.

== Research areas ==
The supercomputer MareNostrum 4 is used in various research areas, ranging from predicting climate change to biomechanics and the analysis of Big Data.

=== Atmospheric composition ===
Some projects in this area focus on researching air quality and developing air quality models as tools to identify sources and processes that determine air quality, as well as predict pollution episodes. Another project investigates aerosols and how they interact with the atmospheric system by dispersing and absorbing solar radiation. Among the many projects in this category, some explore smart cities and the optimization of transportation and human health.

=== Big data ===
This research line includes projects studying the interaction of individuals with computers and others aimed at creating visual and algorithmic tools for analyzing and studying large volumes of data.

=== Bioinformatics ===
One of the main projects in this area involves the integration, storage, and transmission of a large volume of clinical data and simulation data.

=== Biomechanics ===
Projects in this category involve simulations of the cardiovascular or respiratory systems.

=== Climate prediction ===
Projects in this area cover services for agriculture and water management, ocean forecasting, the study of tropical cyclones, and determining the most efficient locations for wind turbines.

=== Cloud computing ===
Current projects in this area focus on energy informatics and the optimization of data centers.

=== Education ===
Analysis of best practices related to education.

=== Engineering simulations ===
Projects include reducing pollutant emissions, drug design, and assisting in fluid mechanics computations, among others.

=== Geophysics ===
Activities involve earthquake simulation, detecting the presence of fluids at great depths beneath the Earth's surface, and analyzing the properties of our planet's surface.

=== Social simulations ===
Research in this area includes studying cultural evolution, energy efficiency, or public safety to develop smart and resilient cities, as well as the study of human groups.

== Image gallery ==
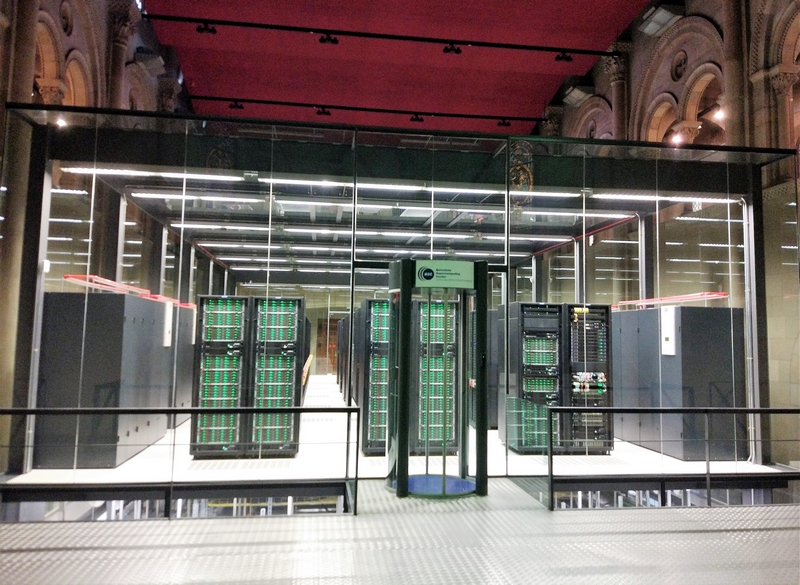
MareNostrum 4 supercomputer at Barcelona Supercomputing Center (2017)

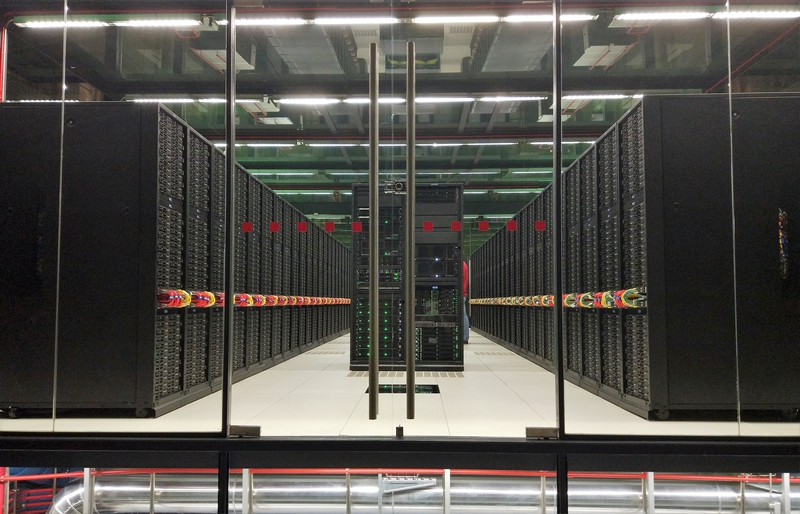
MareNostrum 4 supercomputer at Barcelona Supercomputing Center (2017)

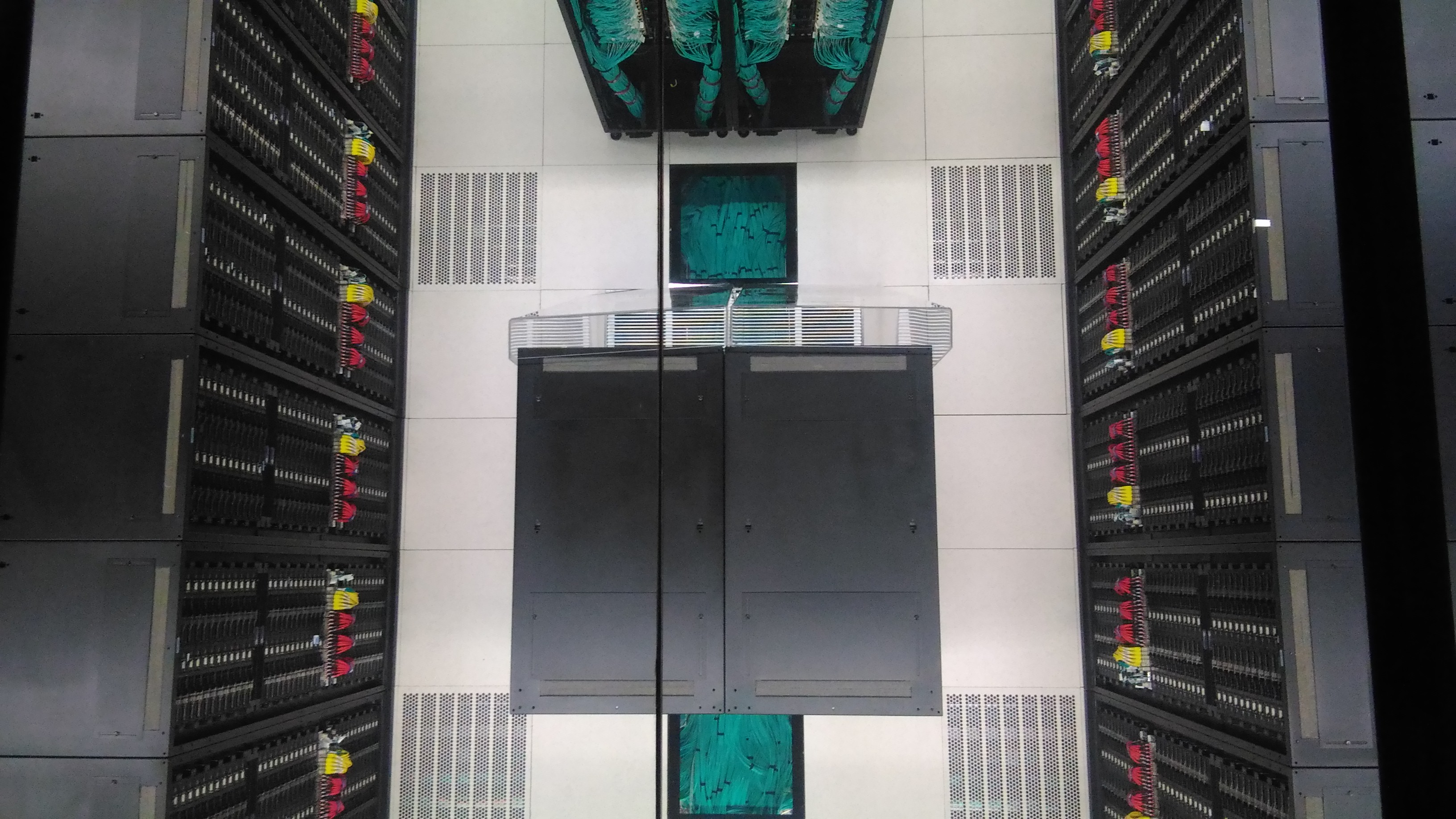
MareNostrum 4 - Top view of supercomputer at Barcelona Supercomputing Center

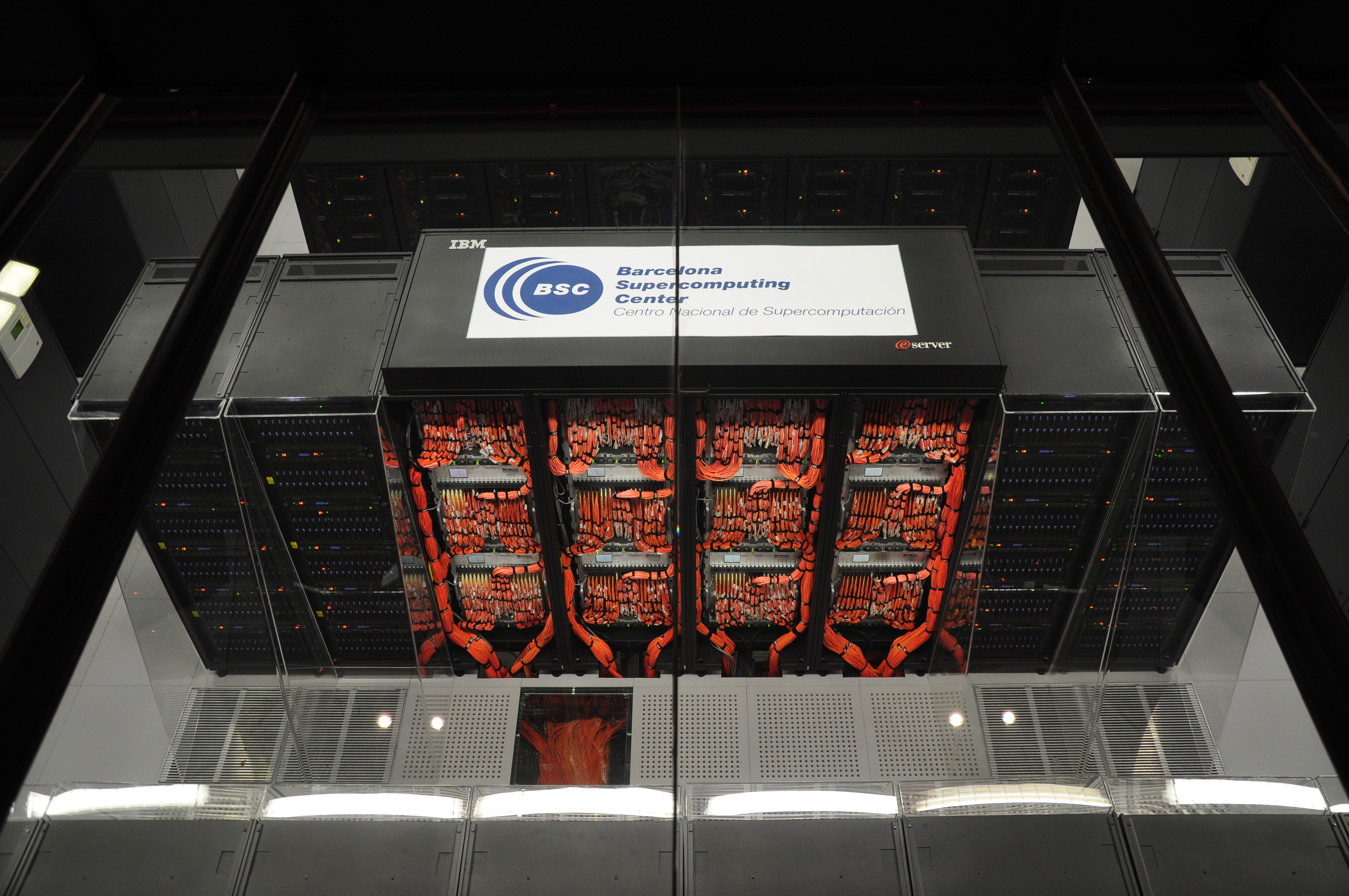
MareNostrum 2 - View from CPU's racks

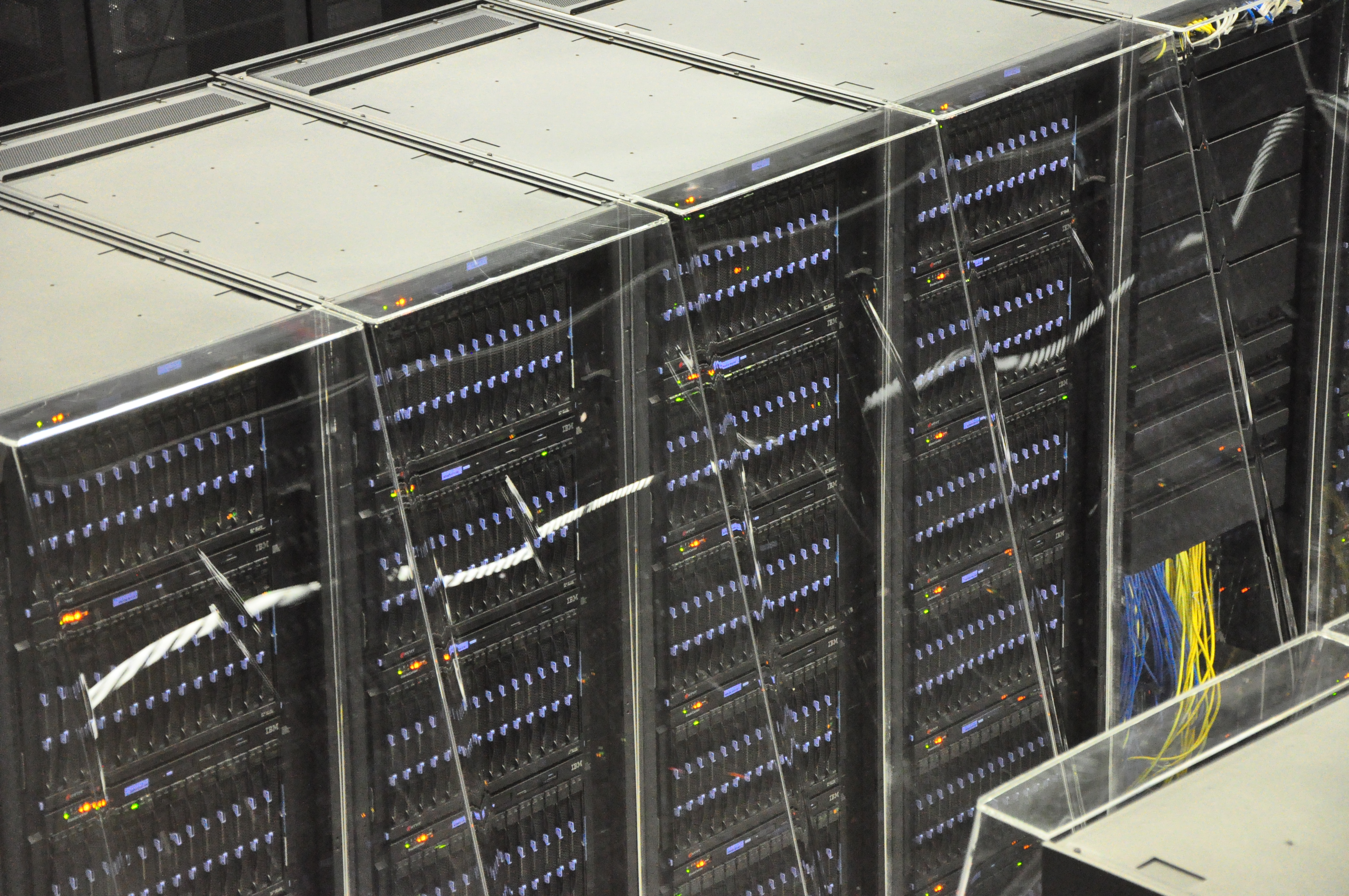
MareNostrum 2 - Racks of CPUs

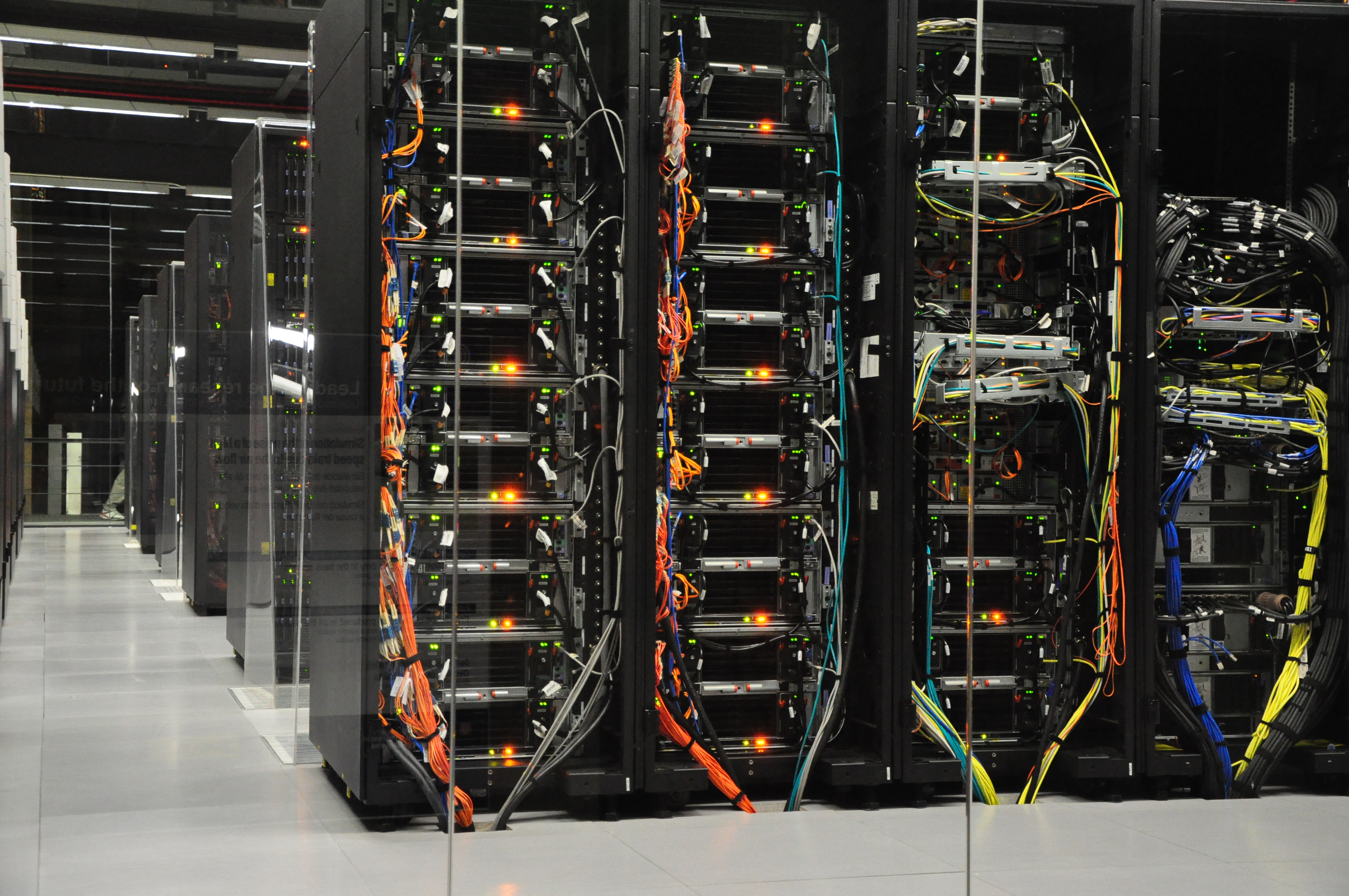
MareNostrum 2 - Refrigerated jail

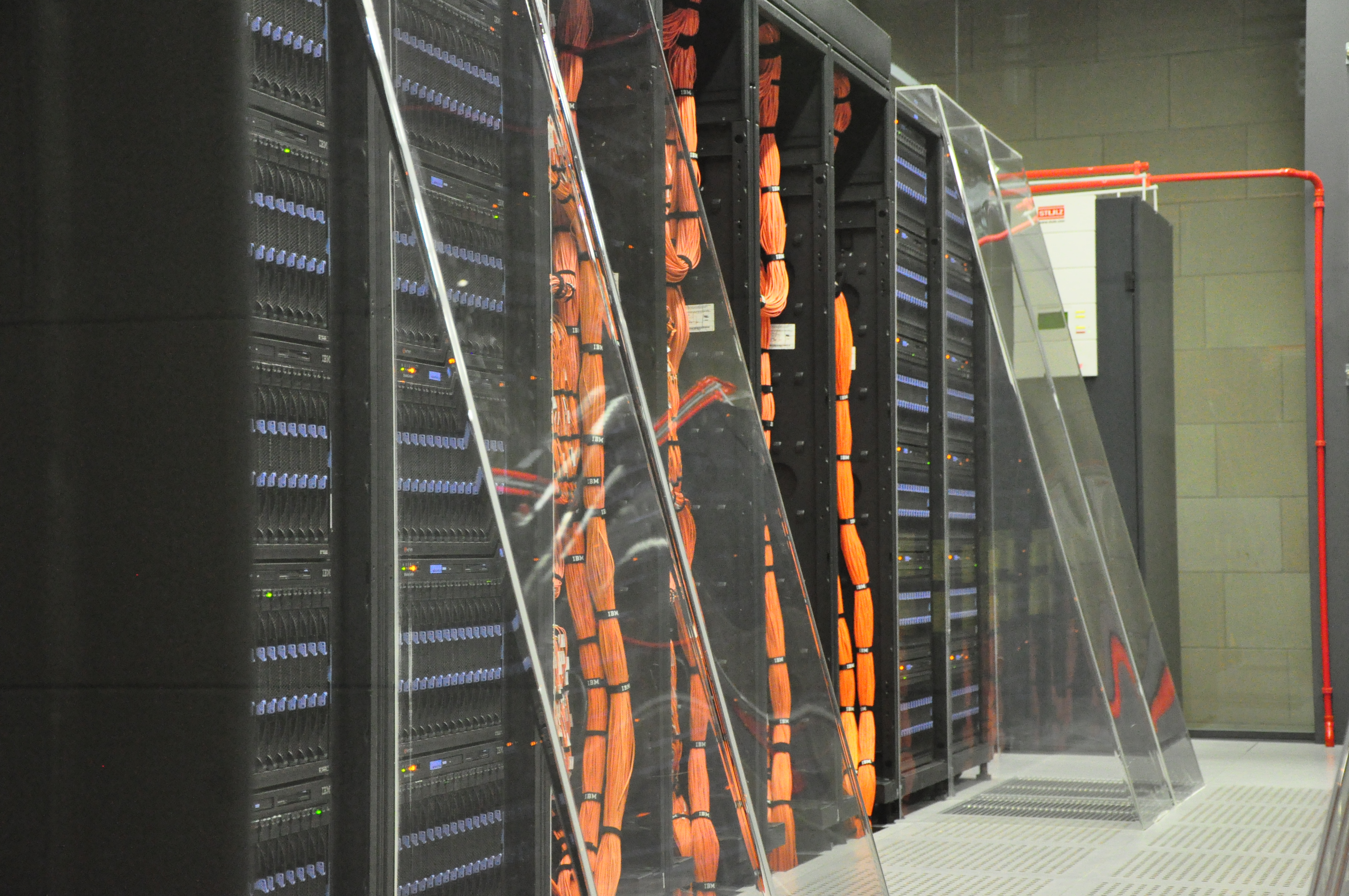
MareNostrum 2 - Refrigerated racks

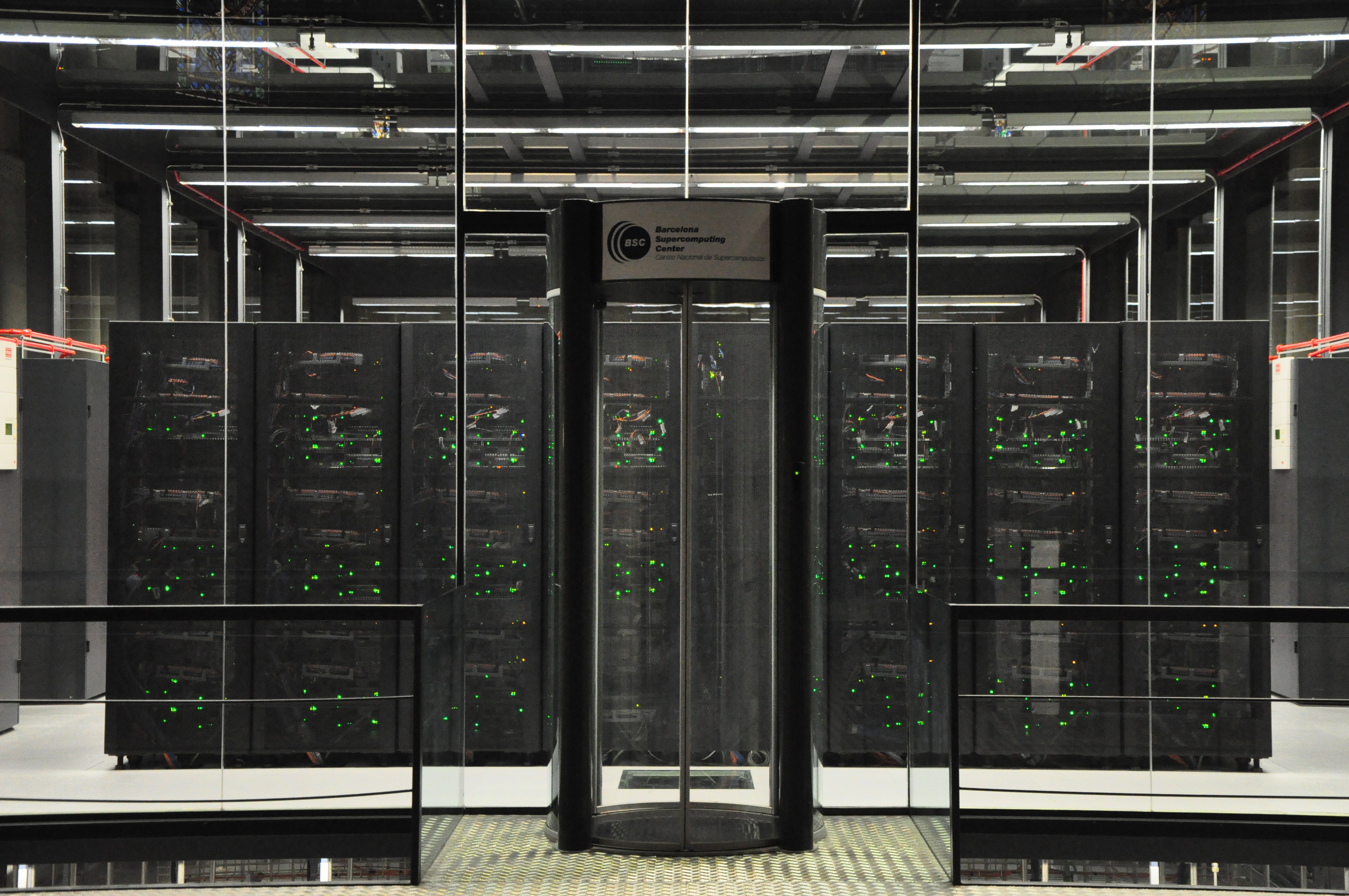
MareNostrum 2 - Door

== See also ==
- LINPACK
- TOP500
