= Network Equipment-Building System =

Network Equipment-Building System (NEBS) is a telecommunications term that describes the environment of a typical United States RBOC central office. NEBS is the most common set of safety, spatial and environmental design guidelines applied to telecommunications equipment in the United States. It is an industry requirement, but not a legal requirement.

NEBS was developed by Bell Labs in the 1970s to standardize equipment that would be installed in a central office. The objective was to make it easier for vendors to design equipment compatible with a typical Regional Bell Operating Company (RBOC) central office (CO). This would result in lower development costs and ease the equipment's introduction into the network. Telcordia now manages the NEBS specifications. The four then-largest US telecommunications companies (AT&T, Verizon, BellSouth, and CenturyLink) created the Telecommunications Carrier Group (TCG), a group formed to synchronize NEBS standards across the industry in the US. The TCG checklist specifies the individual NEBS requirements of each of its members in a matrix, making it simple to compare them.

== Levels ==
"NEBS Level 1" means a very low threshold of equipment hazards and network degradation. NEBS Level 1 addresses the personnel and equipment safety requirements of GR-63-CORE and GR-1089-CORE. Operability requirements are not enforced for NEBS Level 1 certification. It is primarily used for getting prototypes into lab trials. RBOCs require all equipment deployed by CLECs to be NEBS Level 1 certified.

"NEBS Level 2" addresses equipment operability in a controlled environment (usually datacenters) that will not be subjected to environmental stress. Because of ambiguity, this level of certification is rarely (if ever) used.

"NEBS Level 3" is a term from Bellcore special report, SR-3580, and means the equipment meets all of the requirements of GR-63-CORE and GR-1089-CORE. NEBS Level 3 has strict specifications for fire suppression, thermal margin testing, vibration resistance (earthquakes), airflow patterns, acoustic limits, failover and partial operational requirements (such as chassis fan failures), failure severity levels, RF emissions and tolerances, and testing/certification requirements.

NOTE:

1. Verizon and AT&T do not follow NEBS Level 3 or SR-3580. They use their own NEBS checklist, Verizon Checklist (in MS Word format) and AT&T Checklist, that details what they believe are important to their network's integrity. Both accept the TCG Checklist that can be found at those websites.

== Physical protection of equipment ==
NEBS build electronics for telecom network use. It is unique in its focus on telecommunications applications and environments for electronic systems.

For physical protection, good engineering practices cover metal surface treatment and contact compatibility, flammability ratings, component marking and traceability, electrical and mechanical integrity, and a variety of process manufacturing issues.

The RBOCs often require that detail design selection and implementation take into account the various elements of NEBS GR-78, Generic Requirements for the Physical Design and Manufacture of Telecommunications Products and Equipment

GR-78 has requirements that cover details of design implementation that need to be discussed, reviewed, and implemented, as appropriate, in equipment intended to be NEBS compliant. Topics include, but are not limited to, materials and finishes; electrostatic discharge requirements; printed wiring boards and assemblies; connectors, wire, and cable; product marking and identification; and qualification test procedures. GR-78 also clarifies the industry position on the use of Lead (Pb)-free solder and allows for alternative finishes such as immersion silver, etc.
