= European High-Performance Computing Joint Undertaking =

Public-private partnership in the EU

- EuroHPC JU

Joint Undertaking overview
- Formed: 6 November 2018 (began operations)
- Headquarters: Drosbach Building 12E rue Guillaume Kroll Gasperich, Luxembourg City, L-1882 Luxembourg; 49.579640°N 6.111510°E
- Joint Undertaking executive: Anders Dam Jensen, Executive Director
- Key document: Council Regulation (EU) 2018/1488
- Website: eurohpc-ju.europa.eu

The European High-Performance Computing Joint Undertaking (EuroHPC JU) is a public-private partnership in high-performance computing (HPC), enabling the pooling of European Union–level resources with the resources of participating EU member states and participating associated states of the Horizon Europe and Digital Europe programmes, as well as private stakeholders. The Joint Undertaking has the twin stated aims of developing a pan-European supercomputing infrastructure, and supporting research and innovation activities. Located in Luxembourg City, Luxembourg, the Joint Undertaking started operating in November 2018 under the control of the European Commission and became autonomous in 2020.

== History ==
In June 2016, EU member state leaders, meeting in the European Council called for greater coordination of EU efforts on high-performance computing as part of the EU's wider Digital Single Market strategy. The European Declaration on High-Performance Computing was launched in Rome in March 2017, initially signed by seven EU member states (France, Germany, Italy, Luxembourg, the Netherlands, Portugal and Spain) committed to upgrading European computing power. In June 2018, the Council of the EU endorsed the European Commission’s proposal to establish the EuroHPC Joint Undertaking. On 3 July 2018, the European Parliament voted in favour of the Commission’s proposal to create a European High Performance Computing Joint Undertaking. The proposal was formally adopted by the Council of the European Union on 28 September 2018.

The Executive Director was appointed on 15 May 2020, and the Joint Undertaking became autonomous from the European Commission on 23 September 2020.

The EuroHPC Joint Undertaking was reviewed by means of Council Regulation (EU) 2021/1173.

== Funding and objectives ==
The EuroHPC Joint Undertaking is jointly funded by its members with a budget of around €7 billion for the period 2021-2027.

Most of this funding comes from the current EU long-term budget, the Multiannual Financial Framework (MFF 2021-2027) with a contribution of €3 billion, distributed as follows:

- €1,9 billion from the Digital Europe Programme (DEP) to support the acquisition, deployment, upgrading and operation of the infrastructures, the federation of supercomputing services, and the widening of HPC usage and skills;
- €900 million from Horizon Europe (H-E) to support research and innovation activities for developing a world-class, competitive and innovative supercomputing ecosystem across Europe;
- €200 million from Connecting Europe Facility (CEF-2) to improve the interconnection of HPC, quantum computing, and data resources, as well as the interconnection with the Union’s common European data spaces and secure cloud infrastructures.

The EU contribution is matched by a similar amount from the participating countries. Additionally, private members are contributing an amount of €900 million.

The Joint Undertaking provides financial support in the form of procurement or research and innovation grants to participants following open and competitive calls.

The EuroHPC JU has the twin objectives of;

- developing a pan-European supercomputing infrastructure: buying and deploying in the EU at least two supercomputers that will be among the top 5 in the world and at least two other that would today rank in the global top 25 for Europe's private and public users scientific and industrial users, for use in more than 800 scientific and industrial application fields;
- supporting research and innovation activities: developing a European supercomputing ecosystem, stimulating a technology supply industry, and making supercomputing resources in many application areas available to a large number of public and private users, including small and medium-sized enterprises.

== AI factories and InvestAI ==
=== Standard facilities ===
In December 2024, EuroHPC selected 7 locations for the construction of new data centers for artificial intelligence infrastructure.

On February 11, 2025, during the AI Action Summit, the President of the European Commission, Ursula von der Leyen, announced the InvestAI initiative with a budget of €200 billion, including the announcement of a €20 billion fund for the construction of data centers, although claims questioning the scale of the promises have surfaced. The initiative was announced 3 weeks after the announcement of the Stargate project by the President of the United States.

As part of the InvestAI initiative:

- The EU AI Champions initiative was announced, bringing together over 60 European companies that have committed to allocate €150 billion to AI investments;
- The EU committed to allocate €50 billion to support the initiative.

In March 2025, 6 additional data center locations were announced. Locations other than the AI gigafactories will have up to 25,000 GPUs. According to the European Commission, including six facilities designated before December 2024, this brought the total number of standard AI factories in Europe to 19.

=== Gigafactories ===
The fund plans to build up to 5 large data centers, referred to as "AI gigafactories", with a minimum of 100,000 GPUs in each location.

== Supercomputers ==
In June 2019, the EuroHPC JU governing board selected 8 sites for supercomputing centres located in 8 different EU member states to host the new high-performance computing machines. The hosting sites will be located in Sofia (Bulgaria), Ostrava (Czech Republic), Kajaani (Finland), Bologna (Italy), Bissen (Luxembourg), Minho (Portugal), Maribor (Slovenia), and Barcelona (Spain). 3 of the 8 sites will host precursor to exascale machines (capable of executing more than 150 Petaflops, or 150 million billion calculations per second) that will be in the global top 5 supercomputers, and 5 petascale machines (capable of executing at least 4 Petaflops, or 4 million billion operations per second).

In 2022, the EuroHPC governing board selected a further 5 sites to host a new fleet of EuroHPC supercomputers, including the first European exascale supercomputer to be located in Germany.

Currently operating supercomputers procured by EuroHPC JU include:

No	Name	Location	Start date	Sustained performance [PFLOPS]	Peak performance [PFLOPS]	GPU type	GPU number
1	Jupiter	Jülich, Germany	2025	1,000.00	1,226.28	Nvidia GH200	23,536
2	Lumi	Kajaani, Finland	2022	386.00	539.13	AMD Radeon MI250X	11,912
3	Leonardo	Bologna, Italy	2022	249.04	315.74	Nvidia A100 SXM4 64GB	13,824
4	MareNostrum 5	Barcelona, Spain	2023	215.40	314	Nvidia H100 64GB HBM2e memory	4,480
5	MeluXina	Bissen, Luxemburg	2022	12.81	18.29	Nvidia A100-40	800
6	Karolina	Ostrava, Czech Republic	2021	9.59	12.91	Nvidia A100-40	576
7	Discoverer	Sofia, Bulgaria	2021	4.52	5.94	Nvidia H200	32
8	Vega	Maribor, Slovenia	2021	6.92	10.05	Nvidia A100-40	244
9	Deucalion	Guimarães, Portugal	2023	7.48	9.76	Nvidia A100-40/80	132

=== KAROLINA ===
KAROLINA was installed in 2021 at IT4Innovations National Supercomputing Center in the Czech Republic. In the TOP500 list, which evaluates supercomputers in terms of their performance, it ranked 69th worldwide, 19th in Europe, and in the Green500 list of the most energy-efficient supercomputers, it even ranked 8th in 2021. The HPC system supplied by Hewlett Packard Enterprise is designed to respond coherently to the needs of its user communities, addressing complex scientific and industrial challenges, including standard numerical simulations, demanding data analysis, and artificial intelligence applications.

=== Discoverer ===
"Discoverer", the EuroHPC supercomputer located in Bulgaria, was the third launched under the program on October 21, 2021. It is located on the territory of the Bulgarian Science and Technology Park "Sofia Tech Park" in Sofia, Bulgaria. The cost is co-financed by Bulgaria and EuroHPC JU with a joint investment of €11.5 million completed by Atos. Discoverer has a stable performance of 4.5 petaflops and a peak performance of 6 petaflops.

=== Vega ===
The Slovenian "Vega" was the first of the EuroHPC JU supercomputers to be launched on 20 April 2021. The system, built by Atos, is located at the Institute of Information Science Maribor (IZUM) in Maribor, Slovenia. The Vega supercomputer was jointly financed by EuroHPC JU and the Institute of Information Science Maribor (IZUM) to the sum of €17.2 million euros. Vega has a stable performance of 6.9 petaflops and a peak performance of 10.1 petaflops.

=== MeluXina ===
"Meluxina", Luxembourg's supercomputer, was the second to be launched under the programme on 7 June 2021. Located at the LuxProvide data centre in Bissen, Luxembourg, the €30.4 million euros system was completed by Atos, with the Luxembourg government paying for two thirds of the associated costs, and the European Commission contributing the rest. Meluxina has a stable performance of 10 petaflops and a peak performance of 15 petaflops. The system is named after Melusine — a figure of Luxembourg and European folklore.

=== LUMI ===
The LUMI supercomputer is located at CSC in Kajaani, Finland. The HPE Cray EX supercomputer was supplied by Hewlett Packard Enterprise (HPE), with joint funding by EuroHPC and the LUMI Consortium. As of mid-2022, the LUMI-C partition is operational, with the LUMI-G partition expected to become operational by the end of 2022. With a measured High Performance Linpack (HPL) performance of 151,9 petaflops, LUMI ranked 3rd on the June 2022 edition of the TOP500 list of the most powerful supercomputers. Once fully operational, the system will have a theoretical peak performance of 550 petaflops.

=== Leonardo ===
Located in the Technopole of Bologna, in Bologna, Italy, Leonardo is a petascale supercomputer which was installed in 2022. It is supplied by Atos, based on a BullSequana XH2000 supercomputer and hosted by CINECA. It is capable of executing over 250 petaflops.

=== MareNostrum5 ===
MareNostrum 5 will be located at the Barcelona Supercomputing Center in Barcelona, Spain. In 2022, it was announced that the system will be built by Atos. Once operational, MareNostrum 5 will be a top-of-the-range supercomputer, with an expected peak performance of 314 Petaflops.

=== Deucalion ===
Deucalion is a petascale supercomputer hosted at the Minho Advanced Computing Center in Guimarães, Portugal. Officially inaugurated in September 2023, it is supplied by Fujitsu Technology Solutions and integrates a Fujitsu PRIMEHPC system (ARM partition) with Atos Bull Sequana systems (x86 partitions). The ARM partition delivers a sustained performance of 3.96 petaflops and a maximum performance of 5.01 petaflops. Altogether, Deucalion can achieve a performance of 10 petaflops.

=== New supercomputers ===
In 2022, the EuroHPC Joint Undertaking announced a further five supercomputers coming soon to five European countries:

- DAEDALUS hosted by the National Infrastructures for Research and Technology (GRNET) in Greece,
- LEVENTE hosted by the Governmental Agency for IT Development (KIFU) in Hungary,
- CASPIr hosted by the National University of Ireland Galway (NUI Galway) in Ireland,
- EHPCPL hosted by the Academic Computer Centre CYFRONET AGH (CYFRONET) in Poland,
- and JUPITER, the first European exascale supercomputer, will be hosted by the Jülich Supercomputing Centre in Germany.

In 2023, the EuroHPC JU announced a further two supercomputers:

- Alice Recoque, the second exascale supercomputer in Europe, hosted by GENCI in France; and
- Arrhenius, a mid-range supercomputer hosted by Linköping University in Sweden.

== European Processor Initiative ==
In 2021, EuroHPC took over the European Processor Initiative Framework Partnership Agreement from DG CONNECT, and launched its second phase, executed from January 2022 to March 2026. EPI demonstrated several results just after the project end:

- SiPearl's Rhea1 chip ran a complete HPC software stack. The system booted on a test board, with a standard Linux distribution running with high-speed HBM memories and their associated hardware performance monitoring counters. It successfully executed the HPL and STREAM benchmarks, demonstrating the readiness of the complete Rhea1 hardware and software ecosystem for HPC workloads to power Exascale systems. Rhea1 was selected for implementation in Jupiter, Europe’s first exascale supercomputer.
- The project also demonstrated the EPAC (European Processor Accelerator) test-chip family, gathering several IPs from several providers on the same chip:
  - VPU – vector processing unit - led by SemiDynamics and BSC
  - STX – stencil/tensor accelerator – led by Fraunhofer
  - VRP - variable precision unit - led by CEA

Several European projects are using EPI results to implement further steps towards European technology sovereignty: EUPILOT, EUPEX and DARE.

== DARE project ==
In March 2025, EuroHPC launched the 6-year DARE (Digital Autonomy with RISC-V in Europe) project to work on integrated circuits based on the RISC-V processor.

The project envisages the creation of 3 processor projects, each created by a separate company:

1. A vector computing accelerator, done by Openchip
2. A chip for AI model inference, done by Axelera AI
3. A general-purpose processor for HPC computing, done by Codasip

== Members ==
The EuroHPC Joint Undertaking is composed of public and private members.

=== Public members ===
Map of countries which participate in EuroHPC JU

As of October 2026, public members of the Joint Undertaking include:

- Albania
- Austria
- Belgium
- Bulgaria
- Canada
- Croatia
- Cyprus
- Czechia
- Denmark
- Estonia
- Finland
- France
- Germany
- Greece
- Hungary
- Iceland
- Ireland
- Israel
- Italy
- Latvia
- Lithuania
- Luxembourg
- Malta
- Moldova
- Montenegro
- Netherlands
- North Macedonia
- Norway
- Poland
- Portugal
- Romania
- Serbia
- Slovakia
- Slovenia
- Spain
- Sweden
- Switzerland
- Turkey
- United Kingdom

Other EU member states or countries associated to Horizon 2020 are able to become members, provided that they accept the Statutes and financially contribute to the achievement of the objectives of the Joint Undertaking.

==== Observer states ====
The United Kingdom lost its observer status following its departure from the EU on 31 January 2020, but subsequently rejoined EuroHPC in May 2024.

=== Private members ===
The Joint Undertaking's private members include the European Technology Platform for High Performance Computing (ETP4HPC), the European Quantum Industry Consortium (QuIC), and the Big Data Value (BDVA) associations. Any legal entity established in a member state or country associated to Horizon 2020 that supports research and innovation may apply to become a private member of the Joint Undertaking.

== Governance ==
There are three bodies in the EuroHPC Joint Undertaking:

=== Governing board ===
The governing board is composed of representatives of the EU and participating states. The European Commission and each participating state appoint one representative in the Governing Board. Each representative may be accompanied by one expert. The EU holds 50% of the voting rights through the European Commission representative. The rest of the voting rights are distributed among the participating states according to the following lines;

- for the general administrative tasks of the Joint Undertaking, the voting rights of the participating states should be distributed equally among them;
- for the tasks corresponding to setting up the work plan for the acquisition of supercomputers, the selection of the hosting entity and the research and innovation activities of the Joint Undertaking, the voting rights of the participating states that are EU member states are based on the principle of qualified majority. Participating states that are not EU member states hold voting rights for the tasks corresponding to the research and innovation activities;
- for the tasks corresponding to the acquisition and operation of supercomputers, only those participating states and the EU that contribute resources to the procurement of petascale supercomputers and the total cost of ownership of pre-exascale supercomputers have voting rights proportional to their contribution.

=== Industrial and scientific advisory board ===
The industrial and scientific advisory board consists of two Groups which provide independent advice to the Governing Board;

- the Research and Innovation Advisory Group (RIAG) identifies key research priorities. It is composed of no more than 12 members, where no more than six are appointed by the Private Members, and no more than six are appointed by the Governing Board;
- the Infrastructure Advisory Group (INFRAG) provides advice on the acquisition and operation of the petascale and pre-exascale supercomputers. It is composed of no more than 12 members appointed by the Governing Board.

=== Executive director ===
The executive director is the chief executive responsible for day-to-day management of the Joint Undertaking. The position is currently held by Anders Dam Jensen.

== Headquarters ==
The EuroHPC Joint Undertaking is headquartered in the Drosbach Building, used by the European Commission, in the Luxembourg City district of Gasperich.

== See also ==
- Digital Single Market
- HPC Europa
- Supercomputing in Europe
