= Deucalion (supercomputer) =

Supercomputer in Portugal

- Sponsors: European High-Performance Computing Joint Undertaking, Foundation for Science and Technology
- Location: Guimarães, Portugal
- Architecture: CPU: Fujitsu A64FX (ARMv8-A), AMD EPYC Rome 7742 (x86); GPU: Nvidia Ampere
- Storage: 11.1 petabytes
- Speed: 10 petaFLOPS (peak performance)
- Cost: €20 million
- Purpose: Artificial intelligence, big data, other

Deucalion is a supercomputer located at the Minho Advanced Computing Center (MACC) in Guimarães, Portugal. It was inaugurated in September 2023 and is co-funded by the EuroHPC Joint Undertaking and Portugal's Foundation for Science and Technology. It is currently the fastest supercomputer in Portugal and is ranked 297th in the TOP500 global list of supercomputers.

== History ==
In June 2019, the European High-Performance Computing (EuroHPC) Joint Undertaking announced the building of eight supercomputers in several sites across the European Union, with the aim of equipping the European Union with a world-class supercomputing infrastructure. The Minho region in Portugal was one of the selected sites.

In February 2021, the contract for a new petascale supercomputer, named Deucalion, was signed by the EuroHPC Joint Undertaking, the Portuguese Foundation for Science and Technology, and Fujitsu. It was also announced that Deucalion would be installed at the Minho Advanced Computing Centre (MACC).

Deucalion was officially inaugurated on 6 September 2023. It entered the TOP500 global list of supercomputers in June 2024, ranked 219th in processing speed and 80th in energy efficiency (Green500 list). As of October 2025, it's ranked 297th in the TOP500 list.

== Architecture ==
The Deucalion supercomputer consists of two main general-purpose compute partitions based on different processor architectures (ARMv8-A and x86) and one GPU-based compute partition. Users have access to the system through a set of front-end servers. All nodes are connected to a high-performance shared storage through an InfiniBand high-speed interconnect based on Mellanox QM8790 switches, and to an Ethernet network.

Deucalion’s largest compute partition is based on the ARMv8-A architecture and consists of 1632 Fujitsu PRIMEHPC FX700 nodes equipped with Fujitsu A64FX 2.0 GHz processors. Each node offers 16 GB of in-processor High Bandwidth Memory. The partition peaks at 5 petaFLOPS of double precision performance.

The second compute partition is based on the x86 architecture and consists of 500 ATOS Bull Sequana X440 dual processor nodes equipped with AMD EPYC Rome 7742 (2.25 GHz) processors. Each node offers 256 GB of RAM. The partition peaks at 2.3 petaFLOPS of double precision performance.

The GPU-based compute partition consists of 33 ATOS Bull Sequana E410 nodes equipped with four Nvidia A100 GPUs and two AMD Epyc Rome 7742 (2.25 GHz) processors. Each node offers 80 GB of High Bandwidth Memory per GPU and 512 GB of RAM. The partition peaks at 2.7 petaFLOPS of double precision performance.

All nodes have access to a high-performance shared storage based on the DDN EXAScaler subsystem using ES400VNX controllers. The storage offers a 10.6 PB parallel filesystem and a 430 TB NVM multi-purpose high-speed layer. An additional NetApp All Flash A220 network attached storage with 70 TB is available for user homes and spooling.

== See also ==
- Leonardo, another EuroHPC supercomputer in Bologna, Italy
- LUMI, another EuroHPC supercomputer in Kajaani, Finland
