= HPC Europa =

HPC-Europa3
- Funding agency: European Commission
- Framework programme: Horizon 2020
- Duration: 2017 – 2021
- Website: hpc-europa.eu

The HPC-Europa programmes are European Union (EU) funded research initiatives in the field of high-performance computing (HPC). The programmes concentrate on the development of a European Research Area, and in particular, improving the ability of European researchers to access the European supercomputing infrastructure provided by the programmes' partners. The programme is currently in its third iteration, known as "HPC-Europa3" or "HPCE3", and fully titled the "Transnational Access Programme for a Pan-European Network of HPC Research Infrastructures and Laboratories for scientific computing".

== History ==
=== HPC-Europa1 ===
The original HPC-Europa programme (HPC-Europa1), operated between 1 January 2004 and 31 December 2007 under the EU's sixth Framework Programme for Research and Technological Development, (FP6). The programme had the goals of improving trans-national access to high-performance computing infrastructure for European researchers by the funding of visitations, creating new methods for accessing the resources of grid computing systems, and devising new methods of measuring the performance of research programmes being undertaken on supercomputers.

The HPC-Europa1 programme had a budget of €14.2 million, of which approximately €13 million came from the EU budget. An initial tranche of funding of €1.6 million (of which €1.5 million was from the EU budget) was provided between 1 January 2008 and 31 December 2008.

=== HPC-Europa2 ===
The second HPC-Europa programme (HPC-Europa2) operated between 1 January 2009 to 31 December 2012, under the seventh Framework Programme (FP7). Continuing on its goal of improving access to pan-European supercomputing infrastracutre, the programme also had the goals of developing programming models for HPC on Massively Parallel Architectures, to aid visiting researchers with the development and parallelization of their applications, and the development of data-grid tools for Scientific Data Services.

For the first time in the HPC-Europa programme "virtual visits" were offered as part of HPC-Europa2, in which researchers were able to remotely access the HPC facilities from their institutes. However, the final report on the programme reports low up take on this offer, speculating that this was not what researchers wanted from the HPC-Europa programme.

The budget for HPC-Europa2 was 13 million euros, of which 9.5 million euros came from the EU budget.

== Current programme: HPC-Europa3 ==
The current HPC-Europa programme, HPC-Europa3, is fully funded under the EU's eighth Framework Programme, better known as Horizon 2020, with a budget of 9.2 million euros.

Furthering its original goal of funding visitations of researchers to the 8 supercomputing facilities of the programme partners, HPC-Europa3 identified the Baltic and the Western Balkans as two regions to aid in improving the access of their researchers to European supercomputing infrastructure. The programme has also extended its aims to encouraging small and medium-sized enterprises (SMEs) to use supercomputing infrastructure.

The programme also focuses on external co-operation with other European HPC projects, such as PRACE and ETP4HPC.

HPC-Europa3 has ten partners:

- Cineca, Bologna, Italy
- EPCC, Edinburgh, UK
- BSC, Barcelona, Spain
- HLRS, Stuttgart, Germany
- SURFsara, Amsterdam, the Netherlands
- CSC, Helsinki, Finland
- GRNET, Athens, Greece
- PDC, Stockholm, Sweden
- ICHEC, Dublin and Galway, Ireland
- CNRS, National Centre for Scientific Research, France (Note: The CNRS is not involved in the provision of transnational access activities.)

== See also ==
- European High-Performance Computing Joint Undertaking
