= INEA =

INEA could stand for:

- The European Climate, Infrastructure and Environment Executive Agency (CINEA), formerly known as Innovation and Networks Executive Agency in Brussels
- The Instituto Nacional para la Educación de los Adultos in Mexico
- Instituto Estadual do Ambiente (Rio de Janeiro)
- The industrial automation and energy company in Slovenia
