= VTT Technical Research Centre of Finland =

Finnish state-owned research and technology organisation

VTT Technical Research Centre of Finland Ltd
- Finnish: Teknologian tutkimuskeskus VTT Oy; Swedish: Teknologiska forskningscentralen VTT Ab
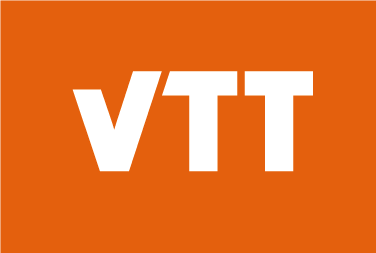

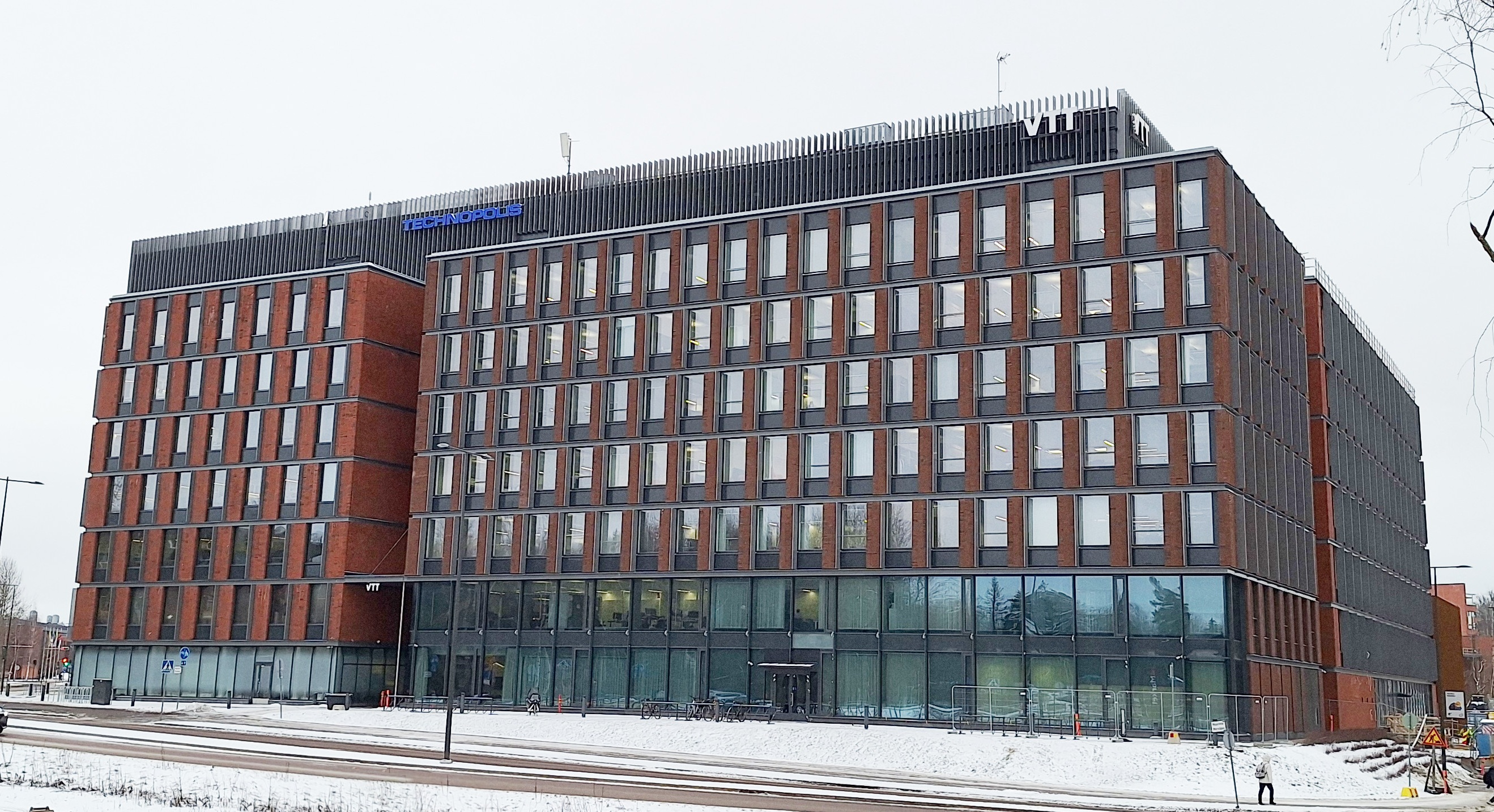
- VTT's main building in Otaniemi, Espoo

Osakeyhtiö overview
- Formed: 16 January 1942; 84 years ago
- Jurisdiction: Government of Finland
- Headquarters: Tekniikantie 21, Otaniemi, Espoo
- Motto: Beyond the obvious
- Employees: 2,349 (31 December 2025)
- Annual budget: €198 million (net turnover, parent company, 2025)
- Osakeyhtiö executives: Kalle Härkki, President & CEO; Pekka Tiitinen, Chair of the Board
- Parent department: Ministry of Economic Affairs and Employment
- Child agencies: VTT Holding Oy; VTT Ventures Ltd; VTT International Ltd
- Website: www.vttresearch.com/en

VTT Technical Research Centre of Finland Ltd (Finnish: Teknologian tutkimuskeskus VTT Oy) is the Finnish state-owned research and technology organisation (RTO) and the largest organisation conducting applied research in Finland. It is a non-profit limited liability company wholly owned by the Finnish state and operating under the mandate of the Ministry of Economic Affairs and Employment, as part of Finland's national innovation system.

VTT provides research, development and innovation services to private- and public-sector customers in Finland and internationally, and also serves as Finland's national metrology institute. It is among the most active European research institutes participating in European Union research and innovation programmes and is Finland's largest single recipient of EU research and development funding; it has accounted for about 17 per cent of the funding Finland has received under the Horizon Europe programme. At the end of 2025 VTT employed about 2,350 people and reported a net turnover of €198 million.

== History ==
VTT was founded on 16 January 1942, during the Continuation War, by a decree of President Risto Ryti under the name Technical Research Institute of Finland (Finnish: Valtion teknillinen tutkimuslaitos, VTL). Its purpose was to carry out technical research for the benefit of science and society. After the war it expanded rapidly, initially focusing on the quality assurance of war-reparation products, and it moved progressively to the Otaniemi campus in Espoo from 1955 onwards. By the 1960s it had become the largest research institute in Finland.

In March 1972 the institute was renamed the Technical Research Centre of Finland (Valtion teknillinen tutkimuskeskus), reflecting a broader role in technology research as Finnish industry grew and diversified. Over the following decades VTT developed into a multidisciplinary research centre, and in 2010 it adopted its present Finnish name, Teknologian tutkimuskeskus VTT, and was reorganised into a parent organisation with subsidiaries.

In January 2015, VTT became a limited liability company wholly owned by the state, VTT Technical Research Centre of Finland Ltd, and the national metrology institute MIKES was merged into it. The corporate form was intended to let VTT respond more flexibly to its customers and operate more freely in financial markets. In 2025, Antti Vasara, who had been President and CEO since 2015, was succeeded by Kalle Härkki, DSc (Tech.), who took up the post on 13 August 2025.

== Research and technology ==
VTT carries out applied research and contract research across fields including bioeconomy and cellular agriculture, nuclear energy and fusion power, quantum technology and microelectronics, materials, digital technologies and sustainable energy. Roughly 70 per cent of its income comes from commissions and from research funding awarded in open competition, with the remainder provided by the state to fund its statutory research mission; the two streams are kept separate. In 2024 VTT published a record 598 scientific articles, 84 per cent of them openly accessible. Much of VTT's impact arises through licensing, contract research and the creation of spin-off companies.

=== Nuclear energy and safety ===
Nuclear research has been part of VTT's work since the mid-20th century. VTT operated Finland's first nuclear reactor, the FiR 1 TRIGA research reactor at Otaniemi, from 1962 until its shutdown in 2015, after which the reactor entered decommissioning.

In reactor physics, VTT developed the Serpent Monte Carlo reactor-physics and burnup code, begun in 2004 and publicly released in 2009. Serpent is used by more than 100 universities and research organisations in some 28 countries and now forms part of VTT's Kraken multi-physics modelling framework.

In nuclear materials and structural integrity, VTT researcher Kim Wallin developed the "Master Curve" methodology for assessing the brittle fracture toughness of ferritic steels. The method became the basis of the international test standard ASTM E1921 (1997) and is widely used to evaluate the integrity of reactor pressure vessels from small surveillance specimens. VTT's reactor-safety research also covers the behaviour of nuclear fuel under accident conditions, including the rupture of Zircaloy fuel cladding during a loss-of-coolant accident, and the use of machine learning to monitor the condition of safety-critical systems.

VTT contributes to fusion research: it manufactures components for the ITER experimental fusion reactor, and in 2024 it became the first foreign partner to join an ARPA-E programme of the United States Department of Energy, working with Lawrence Livermore National Laboratory on materials for the commercial use of fusion energy.

VTT also designs advanced reactors. The LDR-50, a 50 MW small modular reactor for district heat using a passive safety system, has been developed at VTT since 2020. In May 2023 it was spun out into the company Steady Energy, which began building a full-scale, electrically heated (non-nuclear) pilot of the reactor at the decommissioned Salmisaari coal-fired plant in Helsinki, with first concrete poured in early 2026.

=== Bioeconomy and cellular agriculture ===
VTT is active in industrial biotechnology, food technology and cellular agriculture. In 2015 it reported developing hybrid brewing yeasts to create new lager flavours and speed up production, and Fazer has licensed a VTT oats technology.

A prominent line of work is precision fermentation to make animal-free food proteins. VTT research demonstrated the production of egg-white protein (ovalbumin) without chickens, which in October 2020 won the "Impact Expected" category at a European research-institute innovation competition in Brussels. This technology was commercialised by the 2022 VTT spin-off Onego Bio, which uses the fungus Trichoderma reesei to produce a bioidentical egg-white protein marketed as Bioalbumen; the company received a "no questions" determination on its GRAS status from the U.S. Food and Drug Administration in 2025. Another spin-off, Solar Foods, produces a protein (Solein) using microbes and gases from the air.

=== Quantum technology and microelectronics ===
VTT works on superconducting quantum computing and operates shared cleanroom facilities for microelectronics. Together with the company IQM, and with €20.7 million of Finnish government funding, VTT built Finland's quantum computers in phases: a 5-qubit machine in 2021 (later linked to CSC's LUMI supercomputer), a 20-qubit machine in 2023, and in March 2025 Europe's first 50-qubit superconducting quantum computer, named VTT Q50, made available through the VTT QX service.

Under the European Chips Act, VTT participates in several European semiconductor pilot lines funded by the Chips Joint Undertaking — APECS, FAMES, NanoIC and PIXEurope — focusing on radio-frequency technologies for 6G, optical microsystems and chip packaging. In 2024–2025 it received €29 million for the APECS pilot line. VTT's pilot-line activities are based at Kvanttinova, a microelectronics and quantum-technology hub in Espoo developed by VTT, Aalto University and the City of Espoo with €79 million of Finnish government funding; the first semiconductor processes were expected to begin in late 2026.

=== Other research and innovations ===
- In 2014, VTT developed a high-accuracy hyperspectral camera for early detection of skin cancer, commercialised by the health-technology company Revenio.
- In 2016, VTT developed a mobile application and accessory to detect heart arrhythmias and help prevent strokes.
- VTT has developed sustainable textile fibre technologies, including processes commercialised by the spin-offs Spinnova and Infinited Fibre Company, and the enzyme-based Biocelsol method developed with Tampere University of Technology.
- In June 2026, Mitsubishi Electric and VTT announced that they had completed the core development of a direct ocean capture system that removes carbon dioxide from seawater.

== Notable scientists ==
- Kim Wallin, a fracture-mechanics researcher at VTT since 1982 and later an Academy Professor of the Academy of Finland, is regarded as the originator of the "Master Curve" method for brittle-fracture assessment, which became the basis of standard ASTM E1921 and is used internationally, particularly in the nuclear industry.
- Jaakko Leppänen is the principal developer of the Serpent Monte Carlo reactor-physics code, developed at VTT and used by research organisations and universities worldwide.

== European and international role ==
VTT is among the most active European research institutes participating in European Union research and innovation programmes and is Finland's largest single recipient of EU research and development funding, taking part in framework programmes including Horizon Europe, Horizon 2020, Euratom, the European Defence Fund and the Digital Europe Programme. According to the Helsinki-Uusimaa Regional Council, VTT accounted for about 17 per cent of the funding Finland received in the first years of Horizon Europe, making it — with the University of Helsinki and Aalto University — one of the country's most active participants.

VTT coordinates large multi-partner European projects, such as the Horizon Europe Mission project Regions4Climate (launched 2023), which brings together 44 partners from twelve countries with a budget of about €24.5 million. It is a member of the European Association of Research and Technology Organisations (EARTO) — its former CEO Antti Vasara served as EARTO President from 2019 — as well as the European Research Consortium for Informatics and Mathematics (ERCIM) and the European Energy Research Alliance (EERA). In 2024, Vasara was the only Finnish member of the European Commission's expert group for the interim evaluation of Horizon Europe.

== Spin-off companies ==
Numerous companies have been founded to commercialise VTT research, including: Dispelix (augmented reality optics); GrainSense (grain-quality measurement); Infinited Fibre Company and Spinnova (textile fibres); Onego Bio (animal-free egg protein); Solar Foods (protein from air); Steady Energy (small modular reactors); and the quantum-technology component makers Arctic Instruments and SemiQon. In 2025, six VTT-originated startups together raised about €400 million in funding.

== Organisation ==
VTT's head office is in Otaniemi, Espoo, with additional sites in Jyväskylä, Kajaani, Kuopio, Tampere and Oulu. The President and CEO is Kalle Härkki and the Board is chaired by Pekka Tiitinen. At the end of 2025 the company employed 2,349 people, of whom 1,487 were research staff, representing about 60 nationalities. VTT has three subsidiaries: VTT Holding Oy, VTT Ventures Ltd and VTT International Ltd.
