= LinBi =

The LinBi project ran between February 2019 and October 2020 as an EU-funded INEA-CEF project which focused on biodiversity and documentation of the variety of life on Earth. This diversity is preserved in a wide range of formats – books, illustrations, specimen scans, glass plate photographs, sound recordings, herbarium sheets, video and more. LinBi brought together botanists, researchers, the media and the public in a collaborative effort to enhance and support appreciation and use of European biodiversity material. The project has provided 1.3 million items of cultural heritage content to Europeana.

LinBi partners were:

- Rundfunk Berlin-Brandenburg (RBB, Germany) public service broadcaster for the German region of Berlin and Brandenburg,
- Royal Botanical Garden of Madrid (RJB-CSIC, Spain) part of the Spanish National Research Council (CSIC),
- Naturhistorisches Museum Wien (NHM, Austria) which includes departments of anthropology, botany, geology, mineralogy, karst and caves, palaeontology and zoology
- Angewandte Informationstechnik Forschungsgesellschaft (AIT, Austria) an Austrian software and research company specialising in information engineering and development of information systems tailored to complex environments in public administration, social/youth welfare and health care,
- Agentschap Plantentuin Meise (APM, Belgium), an internationally renowned research institution focussing on plant diversity research and conservation.

== Technical overview ==
LinBi created a data enrichment platform to link existing items of data with new items, creating ‘enriched’ information objects. These were then processed by the OpenUp! Natural History content aggregator and provided to Europeana. The project has created three virtual exhibitions for Europeana. These exhibitions interlinked existing content with new and external data. The exhibitions focused on Edible Plants from the Americas (curated by RJB-CSIC), François Crépin and the Study of Wild Roses (curated by Meise) and Magical, Mystical and Medicinal – Psychoactive plants and fungi, (curated by RJB-CSIC).

== Publications ==
- Huybrechts P, Alonso-Sánchez F, Böttinger P, Dillen M, Groom Q, Hanquart N, Koch W, Gordon M, Mergen P (2019): ‘LinBi: Linking biodiversity and culture information. Biodiversity Information Science and Standards’
- Alonso Sánchez, F. (2019): ‘LinBi: descubriendo, interconectando y enriqueciendo el conocimiento digital sobre la biodiversidad europea’
- Huybrechts P, Böttinger P, Fabri R, Hanquart N, Koch G, Mergen P, Rainer H, Gordon M (2020): ‘Citizen Science as a Tool for Connecting Cultural Heritage and Natural History Collections: Providing Valuable Opportunities for Enrichment, Linked Data and FAIRness’
- Pablo Vargas Gomez ed. (2020): ‘En búsqueda de las especias – Las plantas de la expedicion Magellanes-Elcano (1519–1522)’
- Hanquart N, Hoste I, Soffelen P (2020): ‘François Crépin and the study of wild roses: A rose is a rose is a rose – a virtual exhibition from Europeana’ (French and Flemish)
- Huybrechts P, Trekels M, Dillen M, Groom Q, Mergen P, Gordon M (2020): ’Feasibility of 3D and video metadata annotation using crowdsourcing platforms’ (to be published in Research Ideas and Outcomes (RIO) early 2021)

== Further info ==
- Official website
