= Gridwars =

Programming Contest

Gridwars (aka GRID WARS) was a programming contest announced in November 2002 by Engineered Intelligence (EI). The competition was devised to promote EI's product called CxC (a parallel programming language) introduced the same day. Gridwars was also announced in selected forums and through personal invitations.

Four contests were held in total: in February 2003, in June 2003 (Gridwars II), in November 2003 (Gridwars Interactive), and in April 2004 (Gridwars III).

EI was founded by Matt Oberdorfer; in the late 2005 EI discontinued CxC and announced a new product called "I/O accelerator". In the early 2006 EI changed name to Gear6 and replaced Gridwars front page with the announcement of discontinuation. Shortly after the web site www.gridwars.com was shut down.

== Game concept and core rules ==
The game is played on a board aka "battlefield"—orthogonal grid of given size drawn on a torus (thus opposite edges of the field are in contact).

Each cell of the battlefield can be either empty or owned by one of several codes competing for the cells of the battlefield. The code which manages to take over the battlefield or owns most cells after a specified number of cycles is the winner.

The original terminology used by EI was peculiar in that it referred to the competing codes as "the warriors" and to the cells as "processors" of a virtual computing grid (hence "the battle for processors") capable, however, of "firing bullets" at each other.

The game proceeds in turns (cycles). At the beginning of the game, each code owns one cell. Every cycle, codes are executed for cells they own. As it happens, framework program supplies the codes with some data: who are the cell's eight immediate neighbors (by warrior number, 0 for free cell) and its own warrior number. Based on this data, warriors can "fire three bullets" at one/two/three of its 8 neighbors. Gridwars II introduced a principal extension of original rules: warriors could now return 32-bit word, called communication variable or comvar for short, which framework program would supply to each of its 8 neighbors during the next cycle of battle execution.

After all of the cells made their shots, control program evaluates how many bullets in total arrived at every cell from the neighboring warriors, i.e. cells executing the same code. Whichever warrior sends more bullets at the cell (and not less than three in total), takes it over. In case of a tie, cell ownership remains the same.

In principle, the game can be played without a computer: on a board whose size is small enough to make it fun. Players can use private boards or paper to specify shooting directions for all of their cells and then show the shots and update the board together.

Alternatively, firing directions can be specified on the main board in the cell-by-cell manner (using matches, for example), opponents taking turns.

== Winners ==
With the exception of Gridwars Interactive, top three finishers in each competition were honored in EI's press releases and received prizes provided by Hewlett-Packard who sponsored Gridwars (pocket PCs, digital cameras, printers, and 5-node Xeon cluster to the winner of Gridwars III).

Gridwars

1. Scott Balaban (Cleveland, Ohio) 2. John Ours (Cleveland, Ohio) 3. Robert Macrae (London, UK)

Gridwars II

1. Vasiliy Gromov (Moscow, Russia) 2. Mark Wenig (Maryland, USA) 3. Robert Macrae (London, UK)

MEGA GRID WARS league of Gridwars II

1. Robert Macrae (London, UK) 2. Paul Klinge (VTT, Finland) 3. Shanming Loh (Singapore)

Gridwars III

1. Mark Wenig (Greenbelt, Maryland, USA) 2. Paul Klinge (VTT, Finland) 3. Chris Mueller (Katy, Texas, USA)

In the interests of objectivity, table below provides additional details with regard to participation.

Round	I	II	III
Scott Balaban	x	-	-
John Ours	x	-	-
Robert Macrae	x	x	x
Vasiliy Gromov	x	x	x
Mark Wenig	x	x	x
Paul Klinge	-	x	x
Chris Mueller	-	-	x

There were reports in the forum that certain codes from a prior competition were resubmitted for participation by EI, and available information of this kind is taken into account.

== Press and media ==
The event that attracted most attention from the press was, by far, Gridwars II. In particular, the final battle between programs written by Vasily Gromov and Mark Wenig:

New Scientist: "Gladiator-style 'wars' select out weak programs"

BBC Russian: "NASA programmer was bitten by Cobra"

Russian TV channel news: "Our Vasa has beaten NASA"
