= Directorate-General for Mobility and Transport =

The Directorate-General for Mobility and Transport (DG MOVE) is a Directorate-General of the European Commission responsible for transport within the European Union.

DG MOVE was created on 17 February 2010 when energy was split from it to form the new DG Ener. Transport and Energy had been merged (as DG TREN) since January 2000 and in June 2002 the Euratom Safeguards Office became part of DG TREN. That is now part of DG Ener.

In addition to developing EU policies in the transport sector and handling State aid dossiers, DG MOVE manages the Connecting Europe Facility funding programme for the Trans-European Transport Networks and technological development and innovation, worth €26.25 billion.

== Number of employees ==
The directorate General, has 441 employees.

== Mission ==
DG MOVE is responsible for developing and implementing European policies in the transport field. Its mission is to ensure that transport policies are designed for the benefit of all sectors of the society. DG MOVE carries out these tasks using legislative proposals and programme management, including the financing of projects.

== Resources ==
The Directorate-General for Mobility and Transport, based in Brussels, reports to Apostolos Tzitzikostas, Commissioner for Transport. The Directorate-General is headed by Director-General Magda Kopczynska, who succeeded Henrik Hololei.

The Directorate-General is made up of five Directorates plus a shared Directorate with the Directorate-General for Energy and the following agencies across Europe:

- European Maritime Safety Agency
- European Aviation Safety Agency
- European Railway Agency
- Executive Agency for Small and Medium-sized Enterprises
- Innovation and Networks Executive Agency

The Directorate-General is also involved in two Joint Undertakings:

- SESAR Joint Undertaking
- Shift2Rail Joint Undertaking

== See also ==
- European Commissioner for Transport
- European Aviation Safety Agency
- European Maritime Safety Agency
- European Railway Agency
- Transport in the European Union
