= Öjsjömyrarna Nature Reserve =

Nature reserve in Jämtland, Sweden

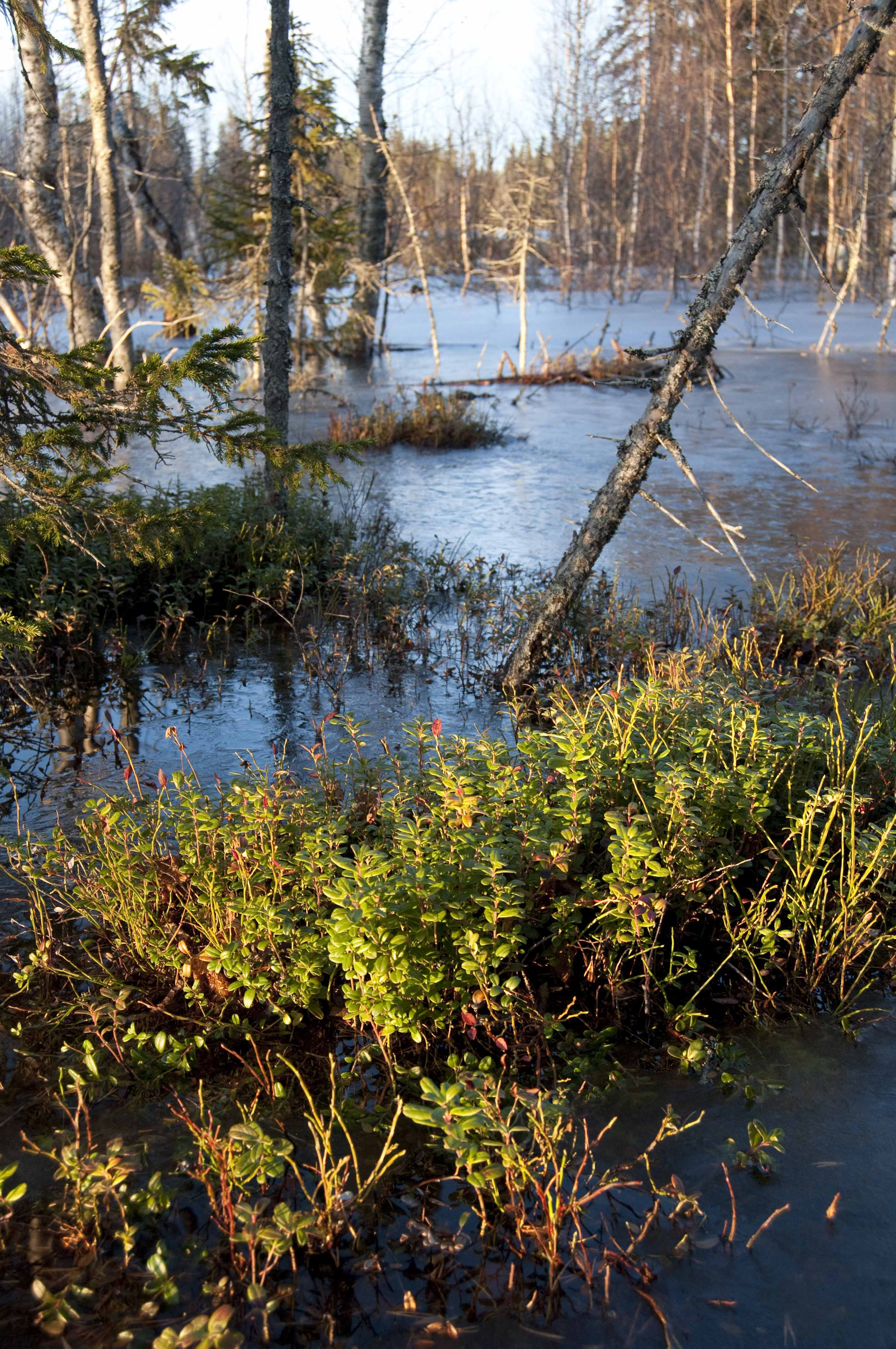

- Location within Jämtland Location within Sweden
- Location: Sweden
- Nearest city: Östersund
- Coordinates: 63°25′N 15°06′E
- Area: 8 km^{2} (2,000 acres)
- Established: 1998

Öjsjömyrarna Nature Reserve (Swedish: Öjsjömyrarnas naturreservat) is a nature reserve in Jämtland County in Sweden. It is part of the EU-wide Natura 2000-network.

Öjsjömyrarna Nature Reserve has been created to protect a number of different kinds of wetlands. Between 2010 and 2015, some of the wetlands were restored through the EU-funded LIFE Programme.
