= LIFE Factory Microgrid =

Demonstrative project cofinanced by the LIFE+ 2013 programme of the European Commission

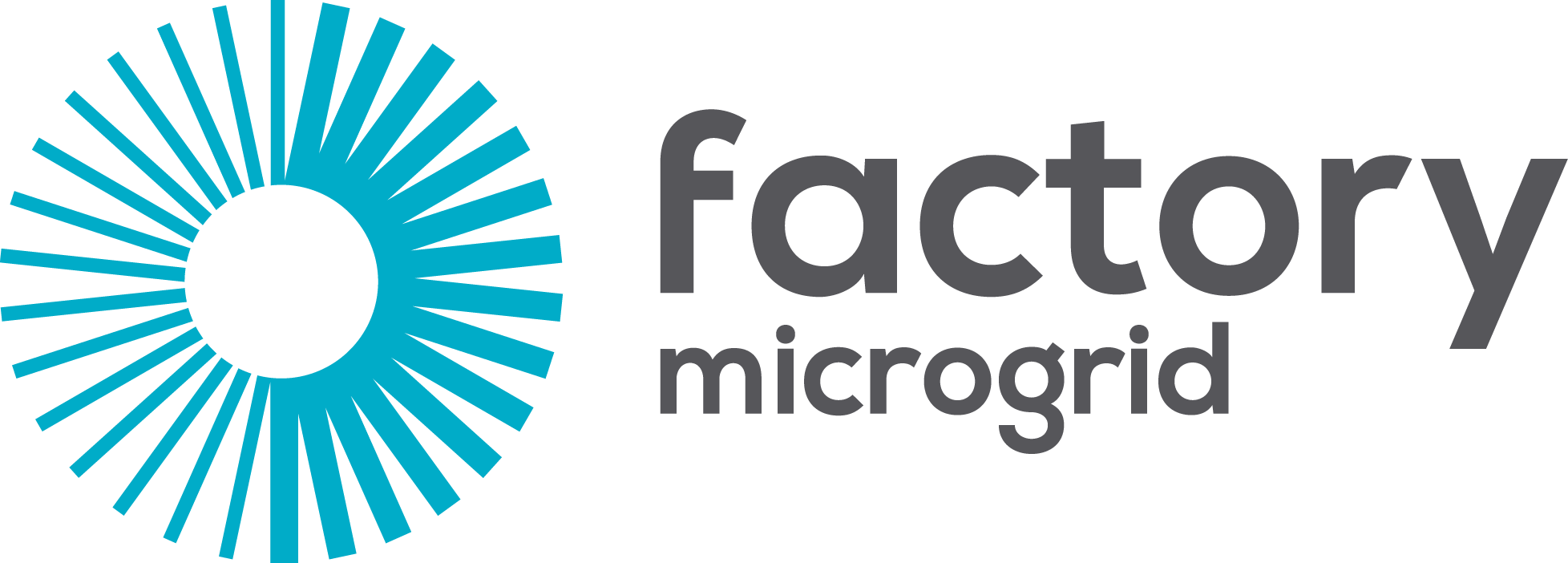
Logo LIFE Factory Microgrid

Factory Microgrid is a demonstrative project cofinanced by the LIFE+ 2013 programme of the European Commission and whose origin can be explained within the framework of the 20-20-20 challenge of the European Union to reduce CO_{2} emissions and energy consumption. More specifically, it can be framed in theme 1, "Climate Change", and within the line of action "Development of innovative practices for the management of smart grids in the context of highly decentralized production of renewable energy". Its main objective is to demonstrate through the implementation of a full-scale industrial smartgrid that microgrids can become one of the most suitable solutions for energy generation and management in factories that want to minimize their environmental impact. At a national level, it is one of the first experiences regarding the implementation of a smartgrid in an industrial plant with and integrated fleet of electric vehicles. Factory Microgrid will take place between July 2014 and June 2017, and represents an investment of around 2 million euros. Approximately 50% of the total amount will be financed by the LIFE+ programme. Project partners are the Jofemar Corporation and the National Renewable Energy Centre, CENER. Isabel Carrilero (Jofemar) is the Project Manager.

== Introduction - Smartgrid ==
What is a microgrid or a smartgrid? Smart grids are energy networks that can automatically monitor energy flows and adjust to changes in energy supply and demand accordingly. When coupled with smart metering systems, smart grids reach consumers and suppliers by providing information on real-time consumption. Smart grids can also help to better integrate renewable energy.

== Main environmental benefits ==
- Enhance the use of renewable energies, while reducing CO_{2} emissions.
- Decrease power peak consumption and provide ancillary services, increasing grid reliability and reducing, at the same time, the need of reserve generation capacity in the electric system.
- Minimize energy consumption due to the management of dispatchable loads, reducing CO_{2} emissions.
- Reduce the use of land for electric generation.
- Reduce transport and distribution losses.
- Transport electrification, which is particularly advantageous when electricity mix comes from a low CO_{2} origin.

== About LIFE ==
The LIFE programme is the EU's funding instrument for the environment. The general objective of LIFE is to contribute to the implementation, updating and development of EU environmental policy and legislation by co-financing pilot or demonstration projects with European added value.
