= Spinnova =

Material innovation company

Spinnova Plc
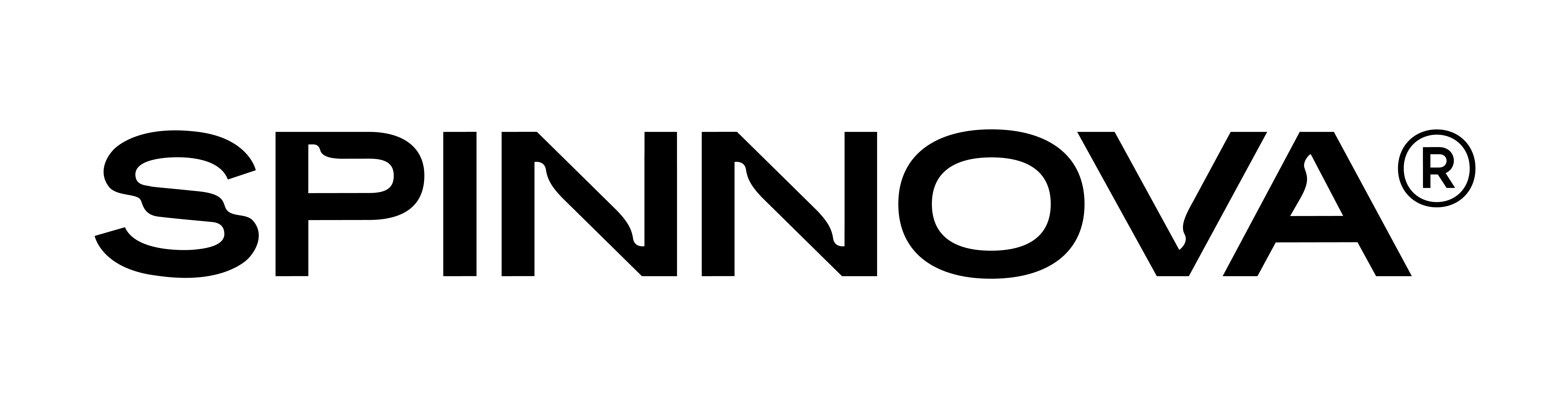
- Native name: Spinnova Oyj
- Company type: Public limited company (julkinen osakeyhtiö)
- Founded: 2014; 12 years ago
- Founder: Janne Poranen; Juha Salmela
- Headquarters: Jyväskylä, Finland
- Products: Textile fibre
- Number of employees: 57
- Website: spinnova.com

Spinnova Plc (natively Spinnova Oyj) is a Finnish textile material innovation company that has developed a patented technology for making textile fibre from wood, pulp, or waste, without harmful dissolving chemicals.

The company has developed a technology which can transform cellulosic pulp into fiber for the textile industry. The company’s headquarters and pilot factory are located in Jyväskylä, Finland, and it has offices in Helsinki, Finland.

== Production Facility ==
In 2021, Spinnova and its partner, Suzano Papel e Celulose, announced plans to build the first commercial-scale fiber production facility in Jyväskylä. The facility, called Woodspin, opened in May 2023, with a capacity to produce 1,000 tonnes of sustainable, recyclable and fully biodegradable textile fibre from responsibly-grown wood each year.

In June 2025 a non-binding agreement with Spinnova and Suzano was announced according to which Spinnova would acquire full ownership of the Woodspin facility from Suzano with a nominal sum of one euro. The transaction was completed in October 2025.

== Technology ==
Spinnova's technology, initially developed at the VTT Technical Research Centre of Finland, led to the formation of an independent company in 2014. This technology is focused on mechanically converting cellulosic fiber into textile fibers using bio-based raw materials. The process avoids chemical dissolution and regeneration, relying instead on microfibrillated cellulose (MFC) to form a spinning-ready suspension that is extruded through a nozzle to align the fibrils and then dried into fibre.

Spinnova has incorporated various materials in its fiber production, including wood, textile waste, and agricultural by-products like wheat and barley straw. In 2021, the company expanded its research and development efforts to include the creation of fibers derived from leather waste.

== Recognitions ==
- 2019 World Changing Ideas Awards Winner in the Experimental category
- Fast Company’s 2020 Innovation by Design Awards’ Sustainability category finalist with Marimekko
- Sustainability Achievement of the Year 2020 award with Bergans
- Scandinavian Outdoor Awards 2021/22 overall winner with Bergans

== See also ==
- Lyocell
