= Trans-European Transport Network Executive Agency =

Former European Union agency

- Successor: Innovation and Networks Executive Agency
- Formation: 26 October 2006 (ratified)
- Dissolved: 31 December 2013
- Location: Brussels, Belgium
- Director: Dirk Beckers

The Trans-European Transport Network Executive Agency (TEN-T EA) was an executive agency established by the European Commission in October 2006 in order to realise the technical and financial implementation of the TEN-T programme. It ceased its activities on 31 December 2013 and was superseded by the Innovation and Networks Executive Agency (INEA).

The Agency was in charge of all open TEN-T projects under the 2000-2006 and 2007-2013 funding schemes. The projects represent all transport modes – air, rail, road, and maritime/sea – plus logistics and intelligent transport systems, and involve all EU Member States.

Its status as an executive agency meant that, although independent, the TEN-T EA was closely linked with its parent, the Directorate-General for Mobility and Transport (DG MOVE). DG MOVE dealt with all policy-making issues related to the TEN-T programme, while the Agency existed to execute the programme's specific tasks with a limited duration (31 December 2015).
