= Digital Europe Programme =

The Digital Europe Programme (DEP) is a fund of the European Union which supports the completion of the Digital Single Market by connecting Europe through "digital bridges" (Digital Service Infrastructures) for the benefit of citizens, businesses and public administrations. It promotes the vision of public services being not only digital by default but also cross-border by default.

The programme was established in 2021 by splitting off parts of the CEF Digital digital infrastructure arm of the Connecting Europe Facility programme.

== Overview ==
The programme concerns two types of Digital Service Infrastructures (DSIs):

- Sector-specific DSIs deploy complex trans-European digital services based upon mature technical and organisational solutions: eProcurement, Cybersecurity, eHealth, eJustice, Online Dispute Resolution, Europeana, Safer Internet, Open Data.
- The DSIs known as building blocks provide basic and re-usable digital services. Building blocks can be integrated into other DSI and IT projects and can be combined with each other.

== Building blocks ==
The building blocks are basic digital services supported by the programme. Building blocks are based on European legislation and standards to help Europeans implement some of the most commonly needed digital capabilities, such as exchanging messages, archiving documents and electronically identifying users. By using building blocks, digital services can be developed faster, easier and more cost-effectively using existing technologies, rather than each organisation developing them on their own. The grants also fund its users wanting to adopt building blocks. Five building blocks have been developed, including eDelivery, eID, eInvoicing, and eSignature. Each come with their own technical specifications, sample software (if applicable) and support services, such as help desk, to support their adoption.

=== Available building blocks ===
There are five building blocks available:

- eDelivery offers specifications, sample software and support services for setting up a registered delivery service infrastructure for exchanging data and documents.
- eID helps to set up the technical infrastructure needed to electronically identify citizens businesses and public authorities from other European Member States, as defined in the eIDAS Regulation.
- eInvoicing supports the seamless generation, sending, receiving and processing of electronic invoices across borders in line with the European Directive and standard on electronic invoicing.
- eSignature helps to create and verify electronic signatures in line with the eIDAS Regulation.
- Once-Only Technical System (OOTS) reduces administrative burden for individuals and businesses.

=== Parties involved ===
Building blocks were initially offered as part of CEF Digital, the programme's digital arm under telecommunications. The European Commission's Directorate General for Communications Networks, Content and Technology (CNECT) is responsible for the definition of the building blocks. Their management and user on-boarding was overseen by the Directorate-General for Informatics (DIGIT). The funding supports the adoption of building blocks. They are arranged through Calls for Proposals and are administered by the Innovation and Networks Executive Agency (INEA) and then by the Climate, Infrastructure and Environment Executive Agency.
