= Axelera AI =

Netherlands-based chip company

Axelera AI is a Netherlands-based chip company founded in 2021 as a spin-off from imec. It develops AI processing units (AIPU) for robots and drones, as well as cars, medical devices, and security cameras. The company's CEO is Fabrizio Del Maffeo. In 2025, it received a grant of €61.6 million to develop its Titania chip for generative AI and computer vision processing from the EuroHPC Joint Undertaking DARE project. Previously it raised $200 million from Samsung and other investors.

== Funding ==
Axelera AI has raised multiple rounds of venture capital and public funding since its founding.

In 2021, the company raised approximately US$12 million in seed financing. In October 2022, Axelera AI secured a Series A funding round of about US$27 million, led by Innovation Industries, and additionally received an innovation credit from the Dutch government valued at approximately US$6.7 million. A follow‑on Series A extension in 2023 brought total Series A funding to around US$50 million.

On 27 June 2024, Axelera AI announced a Series B round of roughly US$68 million, described as one of Europe's largest oversubscribed Series B rounds in the fabless semiconductor sector. Investors included the European Innovation Council Fund, Innovation Industries, Invest-NL, Samsung Catalyst Fund, Verve Ventures, Bitfury, and SFPIM.

In March 2025, the company was awarded a grant of up to €61.6 million from the EuroHPC Joint Undertaking as part of the DARE (Digital Autonomy with RISC‑V for Europe) project to support the development of a high‑performance AI chiplet.

By mid‑2025, Axelera AI was estimated to have raised more than US$200 million (over €200 million) in combined equity investment and public grants. In August 2025, reports indicated the company was seeking an additional funding round exceeding €150 million to expand its activities in edge‑AI and data‑centre markets.

== Products ==
=== Metis ===
Axelera AI's first commercial chip family, Metis, is designed for edge-AI inference workloads such as computer vision, robotics, and embedded industrial applications. The Metis AIPU delivers a peak performance of up to 214 TOPS (INT8) with an efficiency of approximately 15 TOPS/W. It is offered in several form factors, including M.2 accelerator modules, PCIe cards with one Metis processor, and higher-performance accelerator cards integrating four Metis AIPUs (up to ~856 TOPS).

The Metis platform is supported by the company's Voyager SDK and a model library aimed at simplifying deployment of AI inference at the edge.

=== Europa ===
In 2025 Axelera AI introduced Europa, a next-generation inference processor targeting edge servers, enterprise systems, and rack-mount deployments. The chip is specified to provide up to 629 TOPS (INT8). Europa incorporates Axelera's second-generation digital-in-memory-compute (D-IMC) architecture across eight AI cores, along with two clusters of RISC-V vector cores used for pre- and post-processing operations. The design includes 64 GB of memory, 200 GB/s DRAM bandwidth, and 128 MB of on-chip L2 SRAM.

Shipments of Europa-based PCIe accelerators are expected to begin in the first half of 2026.

=== Titania and Future Development ===
Axelera AI has announced development of a future high-performance inference processor codenamed Titania, intended for data-centre-class compute and large-scale AI inference. In 2025 the company received funding from the EU's EuroHPC Joint Undertaking to support the development of this RISC-V-based architecture.
