= European Climate, Infrastructure and Environment Executive Agency =

European Commission agency which manages decarbonisation and sustainable growth

- Predecessor: Innovation and Networks Executive Agency
- Formation: 1 April 2021
- Location: Brussels, Belgium
- Director: Paloma Aba Garrote
- Staff: over 500
- Website: https://cinea.ec.europa.eu/

The European Climate, Environment and Infrastructure Executive Agency (CINEA) is the European Commission agency which manages decarbonisation and sustainable growth. It is the successor organisation of the Innovation and Networks Executive Agency (INEA) (which superseded the Trans-European Transport Network Executive Agency (TEN-T Agency) in 2014). Established on 15 February 2021, with a budget of €50 billion for the 2021-2027 period, it started work on 1 April 2021 in order to implement parts of certain EU programmes. The Agency will have a key role in supporting the European Green Deal, with a focus on creating synergies to support a sustainable, connected, and decarbonised Europe.

== Organisation ==
On 1 April 2021, the European Climate, Infrastructure and Environment Executive Agency (CINEA) officially started its operations.

As the successor of the Innovation and Networks Executive Agency (INEA), and merging programmes and staff from the Executive Agency for Small and Medium-sized Enterprises (EASME), the Agency continues to manage ongoing projects, while being entrusted with the management of new EU programmes worth over €50 billion for the 2021-2027 period delivering on the necessary actions to achieve climate neutrality in Europe by 2050:

- Innovation Fund
- Connecting Europe Facility: CEF Transport (including Military Mobility and the Cohesion Fund contribution) and CEF Energy
- Horizon Europe Pillar II, cluster 5: climate, energy and transport
- LIFE Programme: Nature and biodiversity; Circular economy and quality of life; Climate change mitigation and adaptation; Clean energy transition
- Renewable Energy Financing Mechanism
- Public sector loan facility, under the Just Transition Mechanism
- European Maritime, Fisheries and Aquaculture Fund (direct management) and compulsory contributions to regional fisheries management organisations (RFMOs) and other international organisations

The European Climate, Infrastructure and Environment Executive Agency is entrusted with a portfolio that gives it a clear focus as a climate and environment agency and a key role in supporting the European Green Deal.

== Programmes ==
For the Connecting Europe Facility (CEF), which supports the deployment of infrastructure across Europe, CINEA continues to manage CEF Transport and Energy.

CINEA also continues to manage the implementation of the Innovation Fund, a key funding instrument supporting the European Commission's strategic vision of a climate neutral Europe by 2050.

Under the Horizon Europe programme, the Agency implements the Climate, Energy and Mobility cluster, thus adding Climate to its existing Horizon 2020 Energy and Transport portfolio.

CINEA further expanded its focus on environmental, nature conservation, climate action and clean energy projects as it took over the implementation of the LIFE programme.

The Agency also took on the European Maritime, Fisheries and Aquaculture Fund (EMFAF), which aims to better target public support to the Common Fisheries Policy, the Unions's Maritime Policy and the EU's agenda for international ocean governance.

CINEA manages two new mechanisms contributing to renewable energy and climate neutrality:

- The Renewable Energy Financing Mechanism supports Member States in working more closely together towards individual and collective renewable energy targets.
- The Public Sector Loan Facility pillar of the Just Transition Mechanism is targeted at the regions most affected by the transition towards climate-neutrality.

For example it supports renewable heating and cooling in buildings.

Furthermore, one of the major events organised by the Commission on clean energy is coordinated by CINEA: the European Sustainable Energy Week, a platform to share ideas and know-how, and forge alliances about an Energy Union.

CINEA will run between 2021 and 2027 with almost 600 staff, and a budget of almost €60 billion.

== Other links ==
- European Climate, Infrastructure and Environment Executive Agency (CINEA)
- LIFE Programme
- EU Sustainable Energy Week (EUSEW)
- European Green Deal
- Innovation and Networks Executive Agency (INEA)
- Agencies of the European Union
