= LIFE programme =

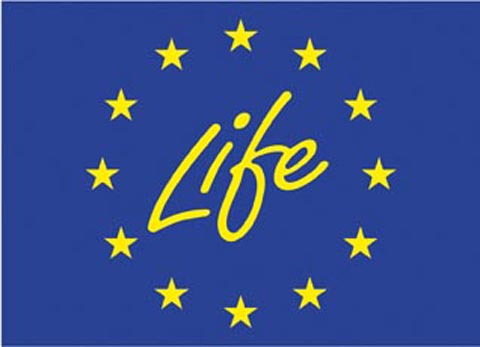
LIFE logo

The LIFE programme (French: L’Instrument Financier pour l’Environnement) has been the European Union's funding instrument for the environment and climate action since 1992. The general objective of LIFE is to contribute to the implementation, updating and development of EU environmental and climate policy and legislation by co-financing projects with European added value. LIFE began in 1992 and to date there have been five phases of the programme (LIFE I: 1992–1995, LIFE II: 1996–1999, LIFE III: 2000–2006, LIFE+: 2007–2013 and LIFE 2014–2020) plus the current one (LIFE 2021-2027). Until 2021, LIFE had co-financed some 4600 projects across the EU, with a total contribution of approximately 6.5 billion Euros to the protection of the environment and of climate. For the current phase of the programme (2021–2027) the European Commission proposed to raise the budget to 5.45 billion Euro.

The European Commission (DG Environment, DG Climate Action and DG Energy) manages the LIFE programme. The commission delegated the implementation of many components of the LIFE programme to the Executive Agency for Small and Medium-sized Enterprises (EASME) until March 2021 and to the European Climate, Infrastructure and Environment Executive Agency (CINEA) since 1 April 2021. External selection, monitoring and communication teams provide assistance to the Commission and CINEA.

== Background ==
During the late 1980s, public consciousness about environmental threats grew rapidly. Large scale environmental disasters such as the Chernobyl catastrophe focused attention on the need for higher levels of environmental protection. Issues such as the holes in the ozone layer over the poles and global warming prompted an acceleration in European environmental policy-making and institution-building.

However, EU action on the environment can be traced back even earlier. EU financial assistance for nature conservation was first made available in the early 1980s, following on initiatives dating back to the 1970s. From 1972, measures to limit pollution and improve waste management were adopted. Then, 1979 saw the adoption of the Birds Directive, hailed by Birdlife International as 'one of the soundest pieces of bird conservation legislation worldwide'. The directive called for co-financing for the management of Special Protected Areas dedicated to birdlife preservation.

This recognition of the importance of providing financial assistance for habitat protection was taken forward in 1982 when the European Parliament succeeded in introducing a small budget line for nature conservation, enabling financing of a dozen or so projects. This funding was renewed in 1983 and provided support for small-scale, preparatory projects that nevertheless had a significant impact. In respect of the later ACE Regulations (Action Communautaire pour l'Environnement or EU Actions for the Environment), this support was known as pre-ACE.

=== ACE – Action Communautaire pour l'Environnement ===
From the mid-1980s, two Regulations broadened the scope of EU assistance for the environment by establishing the ACE financial instrument. Initially, Council Regulation No 1872/84 on action by the Community relating to the environment, operating from July 1984 until 3 June 1987, opened the door for the EU to grant financial support to projects in three fields:

- development of new clean technologies;
- development of new techniques for measuring and monitoring the natural environment; and
- help to protect habitats of endangered species of particular importance to the EU, as defined by Directive 79/409/EEC.

The first Regulation was superseded by Regulation No 2242/87 – ACE II – which operated until July 1991. Its scope was widened to include the financing of demonstration projects in the fields of waste, contaminated site restoration and remedial action for land damaged by fire, erosion and desertification.

In all, the ACE programme funded 53 nature protection and 55 clean technology projects. The total cost of these projects during the lifetime of the programme (1984–1991) was ECU 98 million, with the EU providing ECU 41 million, or 44.5 per cent of the total cost. In addition, a different budget line was made available from 1988 onwards for 'urgent actions for endangered species'. It was not supported by a Regulation but was included in the annual budget of the commission by the European Parliament. In total, 50 projects were financed with assistance totalling €3 million under this budget.

=== MEDSPA and NORSPA ===
Running concurrently with ACE were two programmes supporting environmental projects in two specific regions: MEDSPA (Mediterranean), and NORSPA (northern European maritime regions). MEDSPA ran from 1986 to 1991, supporting 198 projects to the tune of ECU 38 million. Projects financed covered water resources, prevention of water pollution, waste disposal and – more than 25 per cent of supported projects – conservation of habitats and endangered species.

NORSPA had a shorter life, running from 1989 to 1991. It was a special fund set up in response to particular concerns about the northern European maritime regions, and provided ECU 16 million in funding for 38 projects. It prioritised conservation of marine life and integrated management of biotopes, with a particular emphasis on international cooperation and coordination. Projects financed included a programme for return of large migratory species such as salmon to the Rhine, which received nearly ECU 5 million, and re-colonisation of eelgrass in shallow coastal waters around Denmark (EU funding of ECU 252,500).

=== The ACNAT interlude ===
As the ACE programme concluded in 1991, a separate fund for nature, Actions by the EU for Nature (Council Regulation 3907/91, known as ACNAT) was adopted. This was designed to help support the implementation of the newly adopted Habitats Directive in May 1992 at a time when the EU was expanding its competence in the field of habitat conservation. The intention of ACNAT was that actions for bird species and sites could continue to receive support in the context of the Birds Directive and in addition funds would be made available for the conservation of other endangered species and habitats.

In the event, however, ACNAT was quickly superseded by the adoption of a new, all-encompassing environment fund that targeted five main priority fields. With this fund, and its first-phase budget of ECU 400 million, LIFE I (Council Regulation 1973/92) was born.

=== The Creation of the LIFE Programme ===
The adoption of the Single European Act in 1986, which for the first time gave EU environmental policy a firm treaty basis, along with the Fifth Environment Action Programme, approved in 1993, really opened the door for the LIFE funding mechanism. These two developments set the pace of environmental reform for the next decade and the LIFE programme was one of the EU's essential environmental tools.

== Organisation and functioning ==
Every year a call for projects is launched (published on the LIFE website), composed of two strands:

1. Environment: finances innovative actions in the field of the environment, such as water pollution control, waste treatment, etc. and also comprises nature and biodiversity projects (including the Natura 2000 network), as well as environmental governance and information;
2. Climate: finances projects for climate change reduction and adaptation to climate change, as well as governance and climate information projects.

The approach is bottom-up, i.e. it is the project leaders who must set up their project and apply for LIFE funding. The projects to be financed must bring a benefit to the European Union, promote sustainable development and provide solutions to major environmental problems.

== Past LIFE Phases ==
=== LIFE I (1992–1995) ===
During its first phase (LIFE I), which ran from 1992 to 1995, LIFE had a number of components:

- Promotion of sustainable development and quality of the environment (new monitoring techniques, clean technologies, waste disposal, restoring contaminated sites, land-use planning and management, aquatic pollution, urban environment) – indicative allocation: 40 per cent of the programme budget
- Protection of habitats and of nature (protecting endangered species and threatened habitats; combating desertification, erosion, etc.; marine conservation; freshwater conservation) – indicative allocation: 45 per cent of the programme budget
- Administrative structures and environment services (cooperation and network development) – indicative allocation: 5 per cent of the programme budget
- Education, training and information (professional training, environmental education and understanding, dissemination) – indicative allocation: 5 per cent of the programme budget
- Actions outside EU territory (third country assistance) – indicative allocation: 5 per cent of the programme budget

The rates of EU assistance for projects ranged from 30 per cent for income-generating investments to 100 per cent for technical assistance measures. For most projects in the first two categories described above, the level of assistance was limited to 50 per cent of project cost. These rates of assistance remained in place through subsequent phases of LIFE.

Detailed priorities were set each year. For example, in 1993, the sustainable development and environmental quality component of LIFE I focused on projects relating to the textile, tannery, paper and agro-food industries; waste reduction and recycling demonstration projects; decontamination of polluted sites; sustainable development in agriculture, transport and tourism; urban transport; and modernisation of environmental monitoring networks. During its lifetime, LIFE I funded a total of 731 projects, rising from 105 in 1992 to a high point of 245 in 1994 (in 1995, slightly fewer – 237 projects – were funded).

=== LIFE II (1996–1999) ===
The first phase of LIFE was succeeded by LIFE II, also running for four years but with an increased budget of ECU 450 million, covering an enlarged EU (Austria, Finland and Sweden joined in 1995). With LIFE II, the programme was split into three categories – LIFE-Nature, LIFE-Environment and LIFE-Third Countries.

The amended regulation (Regulation (EC) No 1404/96) stated that 46 per cent of the programme budget should be dedicated to nature conservation actions – this programme strand became LIFE-Nature. A further 46 per cent was dedicated to 'other actions designed to implement EU environment policy and legislation.' This strand of the programme became LIFE-Environment. A third strand (five per cent of the budget) addressed actions in countries on the shores of the Mediterranean and Baltic Seas – later LIFE-Third Countries – and accompanying and technical assistance measures (three per cent of the budget).

The scope of the restructured programme was broad. LIFE-Environment projects had to contribute to innovation or policy implementation in the fields of environmental monitoring, clean technologies, waste management, the identification and rehabilitation of contaminated sites, the integration of environmental concerns in town and country planning, aquatic pollution reduction and the improvement of the urban environment.

The objective was to demonstrate new methods and techniques that would have the potential for pan-European application and would pave the way for implementation of existing policies in different environmental fields, or for the future development of policy. Distinct from LIFE-Nature, LIFE-Environment guidelines were formally foreseen in regulation. This was an important change from LIFE I, during which priorities were set on an annual basis.

LIFE-Nature meanwhile set out specifically to contribute to the implementation of the Birds and Habitats Directives, in particular the Natura 2000 network, which promotes the conservation of natural habitats and the habitats of wild fauna and flora while taking into account the economic, social and cultural requirements and specific regional and local characteristics of each Member State.

Nature conservation projects that contributed to maintaining or restoring natural habitats and species populations to a favourable conservation status within the meaning of the Habitats Directive were eligible for financial support. Projects had to target Special Protection Areas or Sites of EU Importance and the species listed in the directives. Projects were chosen purely on their quality and potential conservation impact and not according to national quotas which ensured that only the very best projects were funded every year.

Examples of actions supported include the protection of wolves, bears and bats in Italy, restoration of coastal meadows and wetlands on Baltic Sea islands, and removal of non-native species such as American mink from the Scottish Hebrides.

The objective of LIFE-Third Countries was to contribute to development of environment policy and action programmes in the applicable countries. Projects had to be of interest to the EU, promote sustainable development and provide solutions to major environmental problems.

As LIFE II came to a close in 1999, participation was opened to EU accession countries. The first to get involved was Romania, followed by Slovenia, Hungary, Estonia, Latvia and Slovakia. In June 1999, 'LIFE week' was held, bringing together those involved in LIFE projects. This was initially planned as a one-off event but was considered such a success that it led to the European Commission establishing an annual 'Green Week' in Brussels.

=== LIFE III (2000–2004) and the extension of LIFE III to the end of 2006 ===
The third phase of the LIFE programme ran for a five-year period, though it was implemented in four rounds due to late adoption of the legal base. Its budget was increased to €640 million. Under LIFE-Nature, conservation of natural habitats and wild fauna and flora, in particular the Natura 2000 network, was continued. New accompanying measures were introduced to encourage more multinational projects and networking amongst projects (these were the 'starter' measures to support the preparation of projects involving several Member States; and the 'co-op' measures to support the exchange of experience).

In September 2004, with the publication of Regulation (EC) No 1682/2004, LIFE III was extended for a further two years (2005 and 2006), with an additional budget of €317 million. The intention of the extension was to avoid a legal gap between the close of LIFE III at the end of 2004, and the adoption of new EU financial perspectives in 2007. The proposal for an extension of the programme was based on the positive assessment reached in a mid-term evaluation report. Specifically, the report examined the role of the LIFE programme in the implementation and development of European environmental policy and legislation, and the actual management of LIFE III.

In total, between 1992 and 2006, the LIFE programme spent €1.36 billion on 2750 projects covering 40 countries and territories. The total estimated cost of projects to which LIFE contributed financially represented a huge environmental investment in Europe and neighbouring states. Between 1992 and 2006 the total estimated cost of projects supported by LIFE was €4.0 billion. LIFE therefore provided around 38 per cent of the total investment, stimulating additional investment in excess of €2 billion up to the end of 2004.

=== LIFE+ (2007–2013) ===
The fourth phase of the LIFE programme, LIFE+, ran from 2007 to 2013 and had a budget of €2.143 billion. At the beginning of 2011, the responsibles of the programme highlighted that this budget was still under-utilised by some countries (such as Germany, United Kingdom and France).

The legal basis for LIFE+ is Regulation (EC) No 614/2007. LIFE+ covers both the operational expenditure of DG Environment and the co-financing of projects. According to Article 6 of the LIFE+ Regulation, at least 78 per cent of the LIFE+ budgetary resources must be used for project action grants (i.e. LIFE+ projects).

During the period 2007–2013, the European Commission launched one call for LIFE+ project proposals per year. Proposals had to be eligible under one of the programme's three components:

- LIFE+ Nature and Biodiversity
- LIFE+ Environment Policy and Governance
- LIFE+ Information and Communication.

==== LIFE+ Nature & Biodiversity ====
The Nature & Biodiversity component continues and extends the former LIFE Nature programme. It will co-finance best practice or demonstration projects that contribute to the implementation of the Birds and Habitats Directives and the Natura 2000 network. In addition, it will co-finance innovative or demonstration projects that contribute to the implementation of the objectives of the 2006 Community Commission "Halting the loss of biodiversity by 2010 – and beyond". At least 50-per cent of the LIFE+ budget for project co-financing must be dedicated to LIFE+ Nature and Biodiversity projects.

==== LIFE+ Environment Policy & Governance ====
The Environment Policy & Governance component continues and extends the former LIFE Environment programme. It will co-finance innovative or pilot projects that contribute to the implementation of European environmental policy and the development of innovative policy ideas, technologies, methods and instruments. It will also help monitor pressures (including the long-term monitoring of forests and environmental interactions) on our environment.

==== LIFE+ Information & Communication ====
This new component will co-finance projects relating to communication and awareness raising campaigns on environmental, nature protection or biodiversity conservation issues, as well as projects related to forest fire prevention (awareness raising, special training).

==== Eligibility criteria ====
Projects financed by LIFE+ must satisfy the following criteria:

- Projects must be of EU interest, making a significant contribution to the achievement of the general objective of LIFE+;
- They must be technically and financially coherent and feasible and provide value for money;
- Where possible, projects financed by LIFE+ should promote synergies between different priorities under the sixth Environmental Action Programme, and integration.

In addition, to ensure European added value and avoid financing recurring activities, projects should satisfy at least one of the following criteria:

- Best-practice or demonstration projects, for the implementation of the Birds and Habitats Directives;
- Innovative or demonstration projects, relating to EU environmental objectives, including the development or dissemination of best practice techniques, know-how or technologies;
- Awareness-raising campaigns and special training for agents involved in forest fire prevention;
- Projects for the development and implementation of EU objectives relating to the broad-based, harmonised, comprehensive and long-term monitoring of forests and environmental interactions.

==== Potential beneficiaries ====
LIFE+ is open to public or private bodies, actors or institutions registered in the European Union. Project proposals can either be submitted by a single beneficiary or by a partnership which includes a coordinating beneficiary and one or several associated beneficiaries. They can be either national or transnational, but the actions must exclusively take place within the territory of the member states of the European Union.

==== Submitting a proposal ====
Following the annual call for proposals, applicants to the programme must submit their proposals to the competent national authority of the member state in which the coordinating beneficiary is registered. Member States forward project proposals to the commission, may set national priorities and may prepare comments on proposals, in particular in relation to national annual priorities. The Commission aims to ensure a sound geographic distribution of projects by establishing indicative annual allocations for each Member State. These are based on population and the area of Natura 2000 sites. Proposals sent directly by applicants to the commission will not be accepted.

==== Guidelines for applicants ====
Guidelines for applicants are published annually with the call for proposals. The European Commission also organises information workshops for potential LIFE+ applicants in each EU Member State, providing valuable advice and guidance on what national authorities and the Commission expect from project proposals in national languages. Potential beneficiaries are advised, if possible, to attend one of these workshops, which generally take place in May, June and July.

Answers to some frequently asked questions in relation to the application process can be found on the LIFE website

==== Project selection ====
The project proposals received from the national LIFE+ authorities are registered by the commission and an acknowledgement of receipt is transmitted to the coordinating beneficiary. The LIFE Unit of the Environment Directorate General is responsible for the evaluation procedure. It will verify the admissibility, exclusion and eligibility, the selection and the award criteria and propose to the LIFE+ Committee a list of project proposals for co-financing, according to the criteria outlined in the "Guide for the evaluation of LIFE+ project proposals" (which is published each year with the call).

The LIFE+ Committee is made up of representatives of the 27 Member States and is chaired by the commission. Should this committee give a favourable opinion, and within the limits of the funds available, the commission will then decide upon a list of projects to be co-financed. After approval by the European Parliament, individual grant agreements are sent to each successful coordinating beneficiary for signature.

==== Co-financing under LIFE+ ====
The maximum EU co-financing rate for LIFE+ projects is 50 per cent of the total eligible project costs. By way of exception, a co-financing rate of up to 75 per cent of the total eligible costs may be granted to LIFE+ Nature proposals that focus on concrete conservation actions for priority species or habitat types of the Birds and Habitats Directives.

==== Further information ====
The full text of the LIFE+ Regulation and information for each LIFE+ component – including how to apply for funding, project selection criteria and application forms – can be found on the funding section of the LIFE website.

The LIFE homepage also contains information on the LIFE III programme and projects, including a user-friendly database of all LIFE projects funded since 1992.

==== LIFE 2014-2020 Regulation ====
The LIFE 2014-2020 Regulation (EC) No 1293/2013 was published in the Official Journal L 347/185 of 20 December 2013. The Regulation established the Environment and Climate Action sub-programmes of the LIFE Programme for the next funding period, 2014–2020. The budget for the period is set at €3.4 billion in current prices.

The LIFE programme contributed to sustainable development and to the achievement of the objectives and targets of the Europe 2020 Strategy, the 7th Union Environmental Action Programme and other relevant EU environment and climate strategies and plans. Its most famous action was the "nature & biodiversity" branch which financed conservation actions within Natura 2000 area. This was the most important source of funding for such protected areas in Europe, although there is a growing body of scientific literature asking for a review in the prioritisation of funded actions.

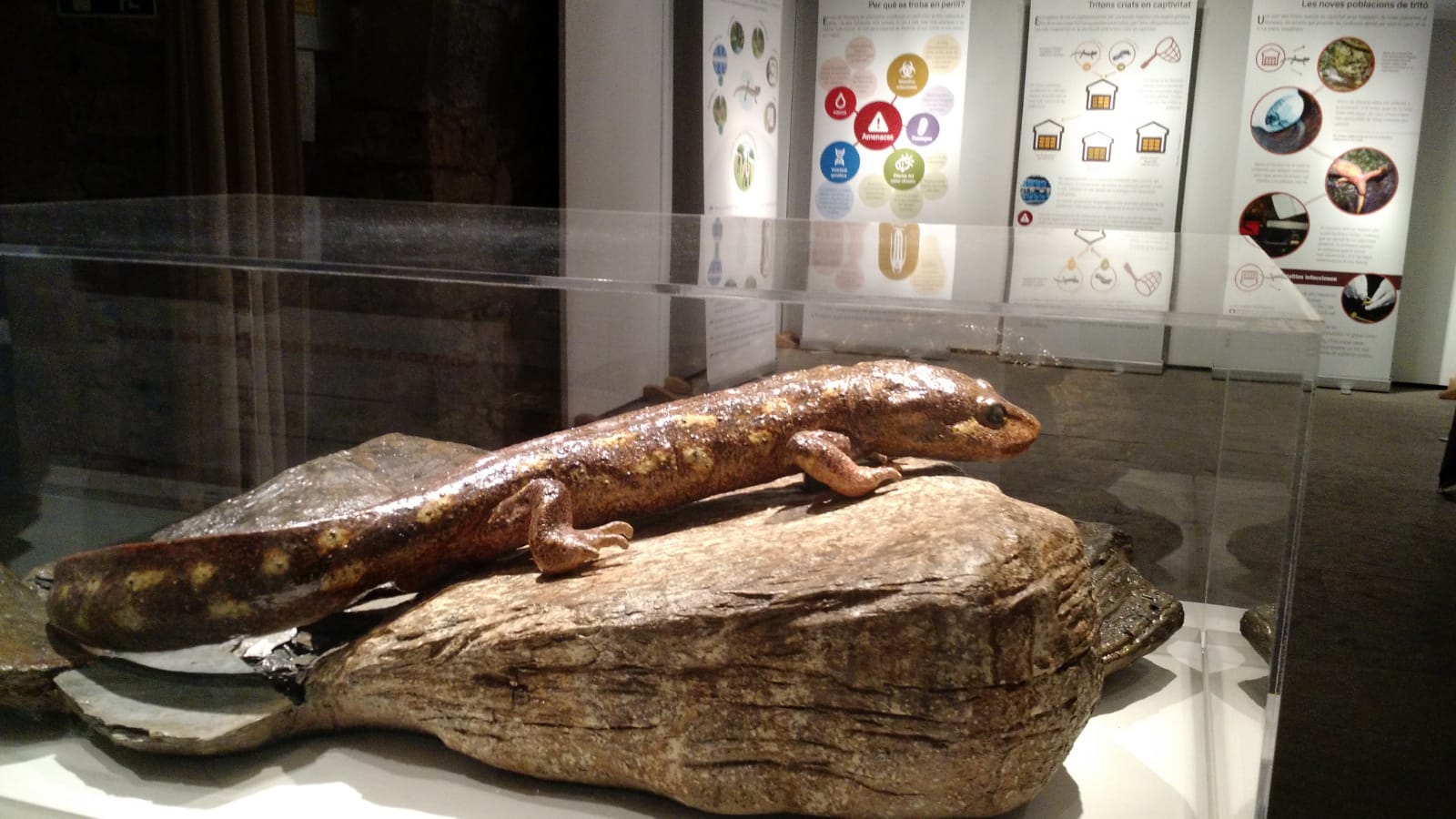
Model of a Montseny brook newt exhibited at the Ethnological Museum of Montseny in 2019. This project was partly funded by the LIFE programme to raise awareness about this critically endangered species.

The 'Environment' strand of the new programme covered three priority areas: environment and resource efficiency; nature and biodiversity; and environmental governance and information. The 'Climate Action' strand covered climate change mitigation; climate change adaptation; and climate governance and information.

The programme also consisted of a new category of projects, jointly funded integrated projects, which operated on a large territorial scale. These projects aimed to implement environmental and climate policy and to better integrate such policy aims into other policy areas.

The regulation also established eligibility and the criteria for awards as well as a basis for selecting projects. The programme was open to the participation of third countries and provides for activities outside the EU. It also provided a framework for cooperation with international organisations.

In June 2017, the European Commission carried out an external and independent mid-term evaluation report and by December 2023 it will complete an ex-post evaluation report covering the implementation and results of the LIFE Programme.

== LIFE multiannual work programme for 2021–2027 ==
On 1 June 2018, the European Commission proposed a regulation establishing a new programme for 2021–2027 aiming to:

- contribute to the shift towards a clean, circular, energy-efficient, low-carbon and climate-resilient economy, including through the transition to clean energy
- protect and improve the quality of the environment
- halt and reverse biodiversity loss, thereby contributing to sustainable development

The Commission proposes €5.45 billion in current prices to be earmarked to the new programme containing two main portfolios, Environment and Climate Action, and covering four sub-programmes:

- Nature and Biodiversity
- Circular Economy and Quality of Life
- Climate Change Mitigation and Adaptation
- Clean Energy Transition

This is 60% more than the previous period. €3.5 billion will go to environmental projects and the remaining €1.9 billion will be allocated to those on climate action.

The European Commission is increasing LIFE programme funding by almost 60% for the next period. LIFE will also expand into four new sub-programmes: nature and biodiversity, circular economy and quality of life, climate change mitigation and adaptation, and clean energy transition.

Nature and biodiversity – there will be more LIFE projects to help protect Europe's nature, thereby contributing to sustainable development. New 'Strategic Nature Projects' are also foreseen. These will help mainstream nature and biodiversity policies into other areas like agriculture and rural development. This sub-programme supports the implementation of the EU's Birds and Habitats Directives as well as the EU's Biodiversity strategy for 2030. It will also help develop the Natura 2000 network and contribute to the Invasive Alien Species (IAS) Regulation.

Climate change mitigation and adaptation – cutting greenhouse gas emissions, increasing climate change resilience and boosting awareness of climate change mitigation will remain a top priority. This sub-programme helps to make the shift towards a sustainable, energy-efficient, renewable energy-based, climate-neutral and resilient economy. To this end, LIFE projects will support the commission's Climate Target Plan and its climate neutrality ambitions.

Circular economy and quality of life – LIFE projects will develop technologies and solutions to enhance the circular economy. Projects include the recovery of resources from waste, and others on water, air, noise, soil and chemical management as well as environmental governance. These support the EU's Circular Economy Action Plan. Also, this sub-programme aims at protecting, restoring and improving the quality of the environment, either through direct interventions or via other policies. And it will continue to implement, monitor and evaluate EU environmental policy and law through Strategic Integrated Projects (SIPs).

Clean energy transition – this new addition will fund LIFE projects devoted to energy efficiency and small-scale renewables to support the Clean energy for all Europeans package. It will ease the transition towards an energy-efficient, renewable energy-based, climate-neutral and resilient economy. And it aims to remove the market barriers that can hamper the socio-economic transition to sustainable energy.
