= Digital Single Market =

European Commission market policy

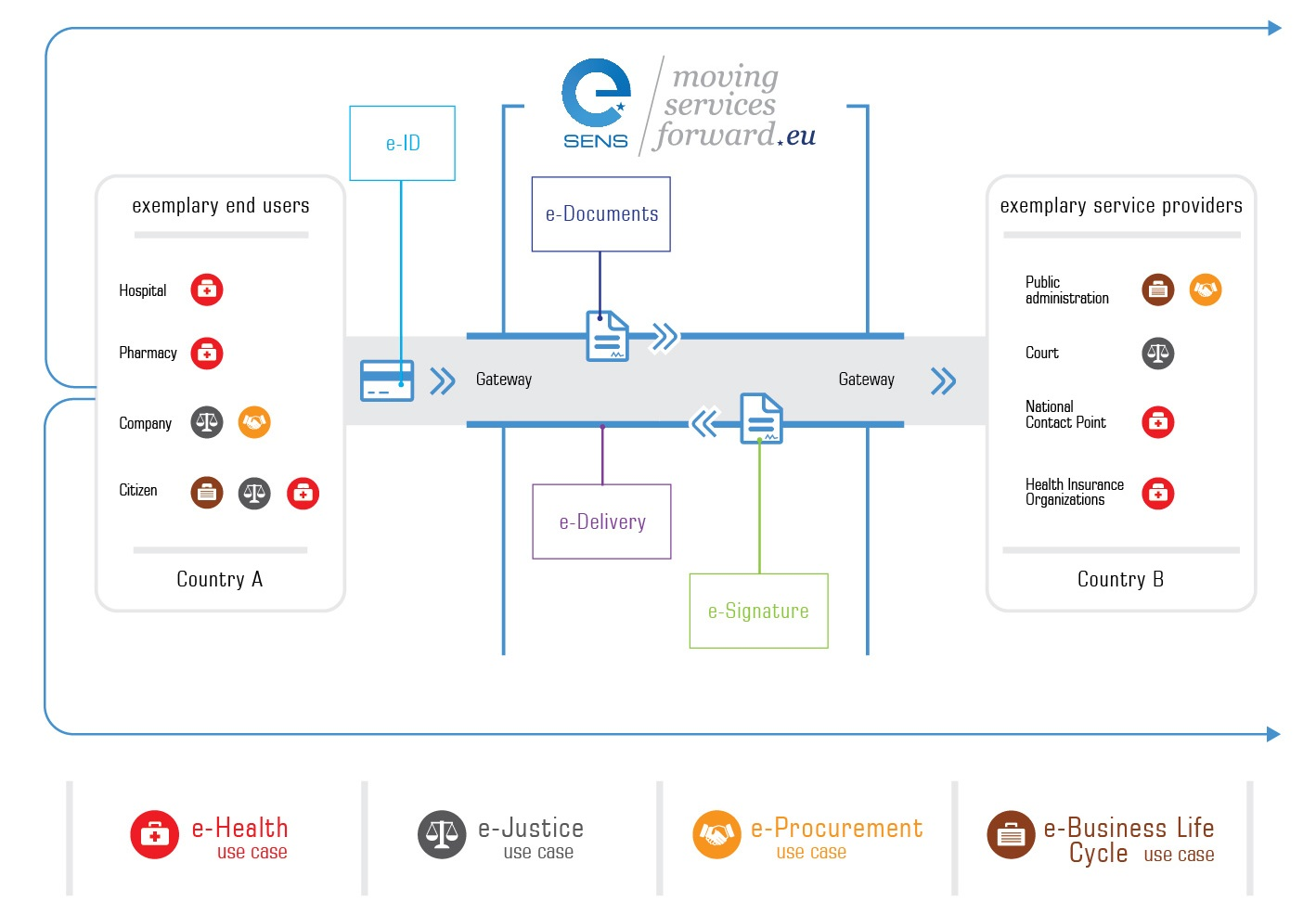
Diagram of the EU digital single market and the facilitation of public services across borders

The term digital single market refers to the policy objective of eliminating national or other jurisdictional barriers to online transactions, building on the common market concept designed to remove trade barriers in other commercial fields.

On 6 May 2015, the European Commission, led at the time by Jean-Claude Juncker, established the Digital Single Market Strategy, intended to remove virtual borders, boost digital connectivity, and make it easier for consumers to access cross-border online content across the European Union. The Digital Single Market, which is one of the Commission's 10 political priorities, aims to fit the EU's single market for the digital age, moving from 28 national digital markets to a single one, and then opening up digital services to all citizens and strengthen business competitiveness in the digital economy. In other words, the Digital Single Market is a market characterized by ensuring the free movement of people, services and capital and allowing individuals and businesses to seamlessly access and engage in online activities irrespective of their nationality or place of residence. Fair competition conditions and a high level of protection of personal and consumer data are applied.

Building a data economy, boosting competitiveness through interoperability and standardisation, and creating an inclusive e-society can realise the growth potential of the digital economy. According to the commission, investment, the acknowledgement of international dimension, and effective governance are required for the advancing of the Digital Single Market. A fully operational Digital Single Market could bring a contribution of 415 billion euros per year to the economy and it would also create hundreds of thousands of new jobs. The Digital Single Market Strategy includes a series of targeted actions based on 3 pillars. From these 3 pillars will come 16 key actions that constitute the Digital Single Market Strategy.

== The Three Pillars ==
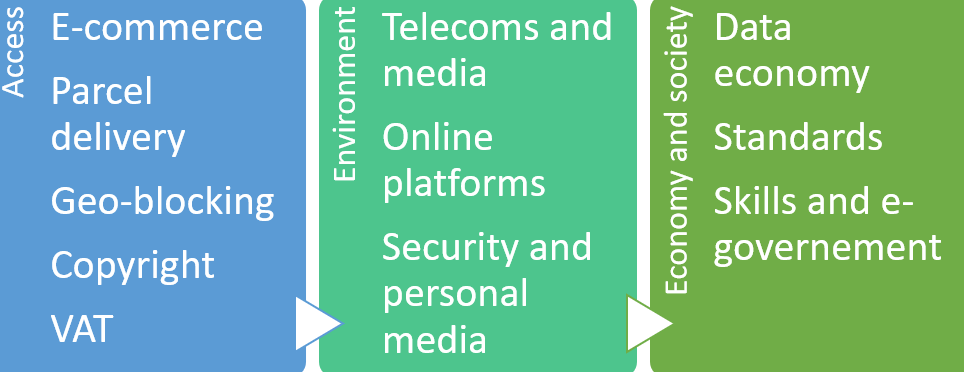
These are the three pillars that are the basis of the Digital Single Market strategy.

The commission has decided to put in place a strategy for the period 2014 - 2019 called "The Digital Single Market Strategy" (DSMS). It aims to give citizens and businesses better access to the digital world. This strategy is based on 3 pillars, each with 3 actions, and with the objective of achieving 16 measures.

=== The first pillar: access ===
It will attempt to implement better access for consumers (individuals and businesses) to the digital world across Europe. The first objective of this first pillar will involve a number of legislative proposals. They will regulate cross-border markets in order to reduce the differences between Member States and also to allow for a "harmonisation of the different VAT regimes". Indeed, there is a difference in contract law and this hinders the smooth flow of trade in the single market. To address this, the commission has proposed two directives (2015) to ensure that "consumers who seek to purchase goods or services in another EU country, whether online or by visiting a shop in person, are not discriminated against in terms of price, conditions of sale or payment arrangements, unless objectively justified on grounds such as VAT or certain legal provisions in the public interest".

A second objective will concern parcel delivery services throughout Europe. However, an exception to this proposal has been made in order not to impose a disproportionate burden on small businesses. They will not be obliged "to deliver throughout the European Union". The third objective will be to address problems of consumer discrimination. It is foreseen that national authorities will have the possibility to check whether sites use geographical blocking. It will therefore be ensured that no consumers can be discriminated against on any basis.

=== The second pillar: environment ===
It will attempt to provide a favourable environment for the development of fair competition for the digital network and all developing environments. At the same time, the protection of personal data will be strengthened. The first objective of this pillar is to transform the market so that it becomes simpler and more sustainable. The environment of the European common market must be conducive to fair competition between traditional telecoms companies and new internet players.

The second objective will involve making access to networks and services more reliable but also affordable. Citizens and businesses must have confidence in these networks, especially in terms of preserving their fundamental right to privacy. To achieve this, it was necessary to reform a series of European regulations, especially in the field of telecommunications, but also in terms of cybersecurity and everything that concerns audiovisual media services. The third objective is to enable the market to adapt to changes in its environment. As the market is based on a sharing economy, it must adapt its functioning to this. The construction of this pillar is already well underway, particularly with regard to cybersecurity and telecommunications. However, the most important measure concerning the revision of the directive on privacy and electronic communications is barely underway.

=== The third and final pillar: maximising the growth potential of the European digital economy ===
The first objective of this pillar is to foster the digital switchover of industry and services in all economic sectors in Europe. It will also be necessary to stimulate investment through strategic partnerships and networks. The second objective will be access to data and capital. This needs to be in place in order to achieve sustainable and inclusive growth. The third objective will be around data protection, free movement of data and the creation of a European cloud. In order for all these objectives to be achieved, it is essential that the first two pillars are in place.

== Role of the European Parliament ==
The Parliament has played a key role in the restarting of the internal market, and is an ardent advocate and agenda setter for the DSM. Before the launch of the Digital Single Market Strategy (DSMS) in May 2015, the Parliament had already been adopting resolutions on the Digital Single Market. For example, on 20 April 2012, took a resolution on a competitive digital single market and e-government. The Parliament also adopted a resolution in July 2013 to complete the Digital Single Market.

In January 2016, to respond to the DSM Strategy proposal, the European Parliament adopted a resolution named "Towards a Digital Single Market Act". The goals of this proposal were notably to ask the European Commission to suppress the geo-blocking practices, to enhance the access to goods and services for the European consumers and also to establish an equivalent consumer protection (equivalent if the goods are being bought offline or online).

Over the years, the EP have been building the DSM via thorough legislative enterprise. The legislation covers a wide range of digital concerns, from the elimination of roaming charges and the prohibition of unjustified geo-blocking operations to the adoption of a directive on actions to "reduce the cost of deploying high-speed electronic communications networks" or a directive on "copyright and related rights in the Digital Single Market".

According to the EP, the legislative achievements of the institution in the DSM area are supplying 177 billion euro every year to economic growth in the European Union. The areas where the principal incomes are from are the European electronic communications and services area with 86.1 billion euro, data flows and artificial intelligence area with 51.6 billion euro and the single digital gateway area with 20 billion euro.

== Objectives and funding ==
=== Objectives ===
The aim of the Digital Single Market is to modernize regulations and make them more homogeneous on subjects such as consumer protection, copyright, and online sales. The European Commission specifies and says that five objectives are noted:

1. Boost e-commerce in the EU by tackling geo-blocking and making cross-border parcel delivery more affordable and efficient.
2. Modernize European copyright rules to adapt them to the digital age.
3. Update EU audiovisual regulations and work with platforms to create a fairer environment for all, promote European films, protect children, and better fight against hate speech.
4. Strengthen Europe's response capacities to cyber-attacks by strengthening ENISA, the EU agency responsible for cybersecurity, and create an effective European cyber deterrence while providing a criminal response in this area, to better protect businesses, public institutions, and European citizens.
5. Help businesses of all sizes, researchers, citizens, and public authorities to make the most of new technologies by ensuring that everyone has the necessary digital skills and by funding European research activities in the fields of health and high-performance computing.

=== Funding ===
To help this, the European Commission intends to use as many instruments and funding possibilities available. However, the full support of Member States, the European Parliament, the Council, and stakeholders is required. Europe needs a regulatory framework applicable to electronic communications that promotes the deployment of infrastructures capable of functioning seamlessly throughout the EU, including in rural areas, while preserving effective competition. Much of the necessary investment will come from the private sector, based on an improved regulatory environment.

The digital single market demands high-quality infrastructure. The EU is already mobilizing investments of around €50 billion from the public and private sectors for the digital transformation of industry. It has also released €21.4 billion from the European Structural and Investment Funds (ESI Funds) which will be available for the digital sector once national and regional strategies are put in place for digital growth, which will strengthen the link between policies and funding targets at all levels.

However, more investment needs to be made in digital technology, especially in areas where digital needs are far greater than the capacities of any of the Member States acting in isolation. Efficiency can be gained by combining and complementing EU funding programs with other sources of public and private funding, notably through the European Fund for Strategic Investments (EFSI). In April 2017, investments in the digital sector associated with the EFSI represented around 17.8 billion EUR, including public and private funding, (i.e., 10% of the total amount of investments mobilized at that date). However, current funding instruments have limitations when applied to large mission-oriented initiatives. Therefore, the commission will explore ways to put in place a framework to support the development of a pan-European high-performance computing and data infrastructure. Combining different EU funding sources with national and private funding would be the best way to stimulate investment.

== Main achievements ==
The following measures have reached to remove or reduce some of the main impediments to cross-border trade.

=== Prohibiting unjustified geographical blockade ===
The Geo-blocking regulation adopted by the EU in February 2018 prohibits any attempt to restrict consumers access to goods and services on e-commerce websites on the basis of their nationality or country of residence and establishment. The customers will be entitled to order the product and services irrespective of their place of connection and without having to pay additional fees.

=== End of roaming charges ===
The elimination of retail roaming charges effective June 2017 is a second achievement of the Digital Single Market strategy. It means that mobile users periodically travelling in the EU are able to call, text and access the Internet on their domestic tariff.

=== Innovate cross-Border parcel delivery ===
Cross-border parcel delivery is another part of the commission's strategy on achieving a Digital Single Market. Its regulation which aims to improve price transparency and to facilitate the assessment of certain high cross-border tariffs, entered into force on 22 May 2018. On the one hand, it implies increased documentation. General conditions of sale of the affected parcel delivery companies and a detailed description of their complaints procedure have to be submitted to the national regulator. On the other hand, it is about improved price transparency. Indeed, each individual national regulator has to publish the public list of tariffs and the terminal rates applicable to items originating from other Member States on a dedicated website and keep them updated. If parcel delivery companies don't comply with the regulation, it will be up to individual Member States to enforce penalties.

=== Providing portability of online content services ===
From 1 April 2018, consumers will be able to access digital services such as an on-line distribution service for films and TV series that they have already paid for when travelling in a different Member State, without restriction and at no cost.

=== Simplification of VAT declaration ===
There is a one-stop shop for VAT registration. The aim is to avoid having to deal with a number of different national tax systems and then VAT rules are simplified in order to incentivize cross-border trade, combat VAT fraud (especially by non-EU actors), ensure fair competition for EU businesses, and provide equal treatment for online publications.

=== Revision of the consumer protection cooperation regulation ===
Addressing unlawful practices and identifying rogue traders are national enforcements authorities' means to protect consumers. Thereby, in order to detect the identity of the responsible trader, information can be requested from domain registrars and banks. Moreover, they can check geographical discrimination or after-sales conditions by carrying out mystery shopping and then can order the immediate take-down of websites hosting scams.

=== Platform-to-business (P2B) regulation ===
In its mid-term evaluation of the Digital Single Market Strategy, the Commission declared that it would present actions on unfair contracts and trading practices in platform-to-business relations. The origin of this P2B regulation can notably be found in the growing significance of online intermediary platforms. Moreover, "online intermediary platforms function as two-sided markets: the more suppliers that use a certain platform, the more attractive it becomes for customers; the more customers use a certain platform, the more attractive it becomes for suppliers". For Françoise Benhamou the characteristics of the two-sided markets make it harder to regulate because an intervention on one side of the market can create non-desired or counterproductive effects on the other side of the market. This two-sided market aspect creates a concentration of supply and demand on a restricted number of online intermediary platforms and because a large part of B2C transactions is taking place on those platforms, "it becomes very important for traders to have access to such a platform and as such, it places them in a weak position vis-à-vis platforms. Platforms may abuse their relatively stronger position in order to impose unfair terms and conditions upon traders and/or to use unfair commercial practices towards them".

The Platform-to-business regulation was adopted on 20 June 2019 and its application started on 12 July 2020, date before which the "platforms had to ensure they complied with the P2B Regulation". For the Commission, the regulation "is the first ever set of rules for creating a fair, transparent and predictable business environment for smaller businesses and traders on online platforms". The regulation also aims to fill the gap between EU and national law and "to establish a fair, predictable, sustainable and trusted online business environment, while maintaining and further encouraging an innovation-driven ecosystem around online platforms across the EU". For Cauffman, "the protection offered largely remains limited to transparency obligations imposed on platform operators. It remains to be seen whether this is sufficient to offer professional sellers the desired protection". The regulation is important because "according to a recent European Commission study, 46% of all business users experience problems with online platforms in the course of their business relationships, with an impact on the EU economy in the range of €2 billion to €19.5 billion a year".

== Specific policies of the DSM (Digital Services Act and Digital Markets Act) ==
The terms Digital Services Act and Digital Markets Act have been firstly introduced in the European Commission proposal from 15 December 2020. The purpose of this new proposal was to tackle the challenges which have not been considered in the E-Commerce Directive from the year 2000. According to the European Commission the Digital Services Act and Digital Markets Act have two main goals. "First is to create a safer digital space in which the fundamental rights of all users of digital services are protected. The second is to establish a level playing field to foster innovation, growth, and competitiveness, both in the European Single Market and globally".

The Digital Market Act aim therefore to raise a level of competition within the Digital Market of the European Union by preventing the digital giants from the opportunity to misuse their position on the market while the Digital Services Act is more focused on the consumer protection issue.

"The Digital Services Act (DSA) includes rules for online intermediary services, which millions of Europeans use every day. The obligations of different online players match their role, size and impact in the online ecosystem.The Digital Markets Act (DMA) establishes a set of narrowly defined objective criteria for qualifying a large online platform as a so-called “gatekeeper”.

As large systemic online platforms or gatekeepers can be considered the companies which meet the following criteria:

- "strong economic position, significant impact on the internal market and is active in multiple EU countries"
- "strong intermediation position, meaning that it links a large user base to a large number of businesses"
- "(or is about to have) an entrenched and durable position in the market, meaning that it is stable over time".

One of the main obstacles which large platforms are causing for the market competitiveness is the strengthening of the market entry barriers, which is one of the typical market power abuse features. In order to restrain the market power of the digital giants, there will be established particular rules for the routine procedures.

"For instance, the gatekeepers are supposed to allow third parties to inter-operate with the gatekeeper's own services in certain specific situations, allow their business users to access the data that they generate in their use of the gatekeeper's platform, provide companies advertising on their platform with the tools and information necessary for advertisers and publishers to carry out their own independent verification of their advertisements hosted by the gatekeeper, allow their business users to promote their offer and conclude contracts with their customers outside the gatekeeper's platform. The gatekeepers are not permitted to treat services and products offered by the gatekeeper itself more favourably than similar services or products offered by third parties on the gatekeeper's platform, to prevent consumers from linking up to businesses outside their platforms, to prevent users from uninstalling any pre-installed software or app if they wish so".

In terms of subsidiarity principle of the European Union the DSA and DMA are both going to be the objectives of supranational level.The reason for that is that: "the problems are of a cross-border nature, and not limited to single Member States or to a subset of Member States. The digital sector as such and in particular the core platform services are of a cross-border nature. As is evidenced by the volume of cross-border trade, almost 24% of total online trade in Europe is cross-border".

According to the Commissions` proposal the impact of the Digital Services Act and the Digital Markets Act on the European digital market shall be monitored. The monitoring of the DSA and DMA is divided into regular monitoring, each two years and the qualitative assessments, with usage of a market assessment indicators.

"Regular and continuous monitoring is covering the following main aspects: the on scope-related issues (e.g. criteria for the designation of gatekeepers, evolution of the designation of gatekeepers, use of the qualitative assessment in the designation process); (ii) unfair practices (compliance, enforcement patterns, evolution); and (iii) monitoring as a trigger for the launch of a market investigation with the purpose of examining new core platform services and practices in the digital sector".

Speaking about the monitoring, there will be also developed the numerous indicators, which aim is to assess the implementation of the proposal and the achievement of the aim of contestable and fair digital Market. The Expert Group of the Online Platform Economy will monitor some of the general economic indicators. "Consequently, the impact of the intervention will be assessed in the context of an evaluation exercise and activate, if so required, a review clause, which will allow the Commission to take appropriate measures, including legislative proposals. Member States are also supposed to provide any relevant information they have that the Commission may require for the evaluation purposes".

Though DSA and DMA are still proposals of the European Commission, there have been already made researches about the expected effects political effects from the new legislation. One of the anticipated impacts is the sovereignisation of Europe because of more integration due to the harmonisation of the Digital Market.

== International dimension ==
On 4 July 2013, the European Parliament adopted a new resolution concerning the achievement of the digital single market with the willingness notably to develop mobility services and international dimension of this market. However, in 2015, the international dimension of the digital single market was not well defined in the strategy of the Commission concerning the digital single market. The part of international dimension on the digital single market was short, and only contained the willingness of the EU to encourage its trading partners to expand their markets and deploy a sustainable approach concerning internet governance. Moreover, current trade negotiations led at the World Trade Organization and in other negotiations channels were not mentioned. But during this same year the EU was the first exporter of digital services in the world. The goal of the EU was to be a more attractive location for global companies. The new Trade and Investment Strategy presented in autumn 2015 showed an ambition to develop digital trade and investment policy.

In 2018, the US dominated the field of digital technologies with its big firms as Facebook, which led the competitiveness for the EU in this field. One of the reasons was that the European measures concerning technological products innovations in the EU were unfavourable for the growth and competitiveness of EU digital technologies. The consequence of this issue is that American digital firms as Facebook can take those innovative ideas issued from the EU, export them in the US territory and make them their own. In 2020, the EU demonstrated its willingness to play a key role on international dimensions, including its digital policy orientation towards societal interests, prosperity and competitiveness, through the tool of diplomacy, the use of a power of regulation and the financial instruments.

The Digital Single Market is a strategy put in place for the European Union to catch up with its competitors in the digital sector. Indeed, the EU is behind the United States and China that are dominating the digital world. This can be explained by the fact that the European Union invested later in the digital domain than the United States or China, but it can also be explained by European public policies in the digital field. Indeed, although the size of the European Union and its wealth per capita, it is very difficult to compete with the United States and China, and it is partly due to certain European public policies. Some European policies are not very favorable to the digital economy as can be seen from the various policies that are rather hostile to the new economy, we can cite among these policies: the competition policy or the general regulation of data protection. Today, the digital sector is still constrained into national territories and this is another reason for the delay of the European Union in the digital sector. Indeed, the development of digital is very heterogeneous in the European Union. This heterogeneity is due to the presence of different economic developments but also to the different development of each country in the digital era, which leads to different catching up movements for each state. And we can classify the 27 European countries into 5 groups according to their contributions to the digital sector. And it is therefore to overcome this delay and this difference in digital development between the member states of the European Union that the strategy of the Digital Single Market was created.

== Next steps for the Digital Single Market ==
=== Deregulation ===
Future steps taken on building the DSM should be more dynamic and should focus on deregulation rather than simple regulation in order to address issues where there is no sufficient focus on and to keep up with the speed of the digital transformation. Furthermore, there is also too much insecurity about how companies can actually adhere to DSM current rules.

For instance, the roaming ban is a positive step toward the digital single market but the different ways by which Telecom companies are trying to poach revenue do not correspond with the bottom-up idea of market-driven integration. Similarly, the parcel delivery legislation was positive but the problems related to transparency on costs are not truly tackled.

Another example is regarding geo-blocking. Indeed, although "unjustified geo-blocking" is prohibited, small businesses are forced to commit to sell to a larger market while abiding costs this may incur depending on the destination country in question. Finally, there is a one-stop shop for VAT registration, which is a good step, but a variety of VAT rates across member states still remains which restrict trade.

=== Conceptual problems ===
In work to create a Digital Single Market, there are three conceptual problems. First, several reforms which have focused much on digital-specific regulations have added new layers of regulatory complication to data-based commerce in Europe. Second, many of the regulations on data give confusion rather than given clarity and adding more opportunities for experimentation and innovation. Third, the EU's various regulations can have clashes between them. There is therefore a lack of coordination hence the necessity of a clearer taxonomy of the specific ambitions of one regulation. Therefore, in order to create a better and larger space for the digital economy to grow, the efforts of the Europeans institutions and Member-State governments have to be redoubled in the next few years.

=== Challenges ===
The main challenge faced is the fragmentation of the digital single market with twenty-seven national regimes. In a digital environment, which is by nature cross-border, national or regional markets do not offer sufficient size, either to generate final demand or to support investment and innovation. Digital companies need a pan-European market to thrive and compete with global leaders, who themselves benefit from large domestic markets. Businesses and citizens alike need world-class digital infrastructure, such as high-speed networks, cloud computing, high performance computing and big data. They also need digital skills, regardless of their sector.

The DSM also raises legitimate concerns about the future of employment: beyond its impact on certain professions, the digital economy is structurally modifying the distribution of jobs and putting an end to a long trend of expansion of salaried employment, posing new challenges to labor law and social protection.

Moreover, the creation of the digital single market raises the question of certain large companies, particularly the GAFAMs. Indeed, having become too powerful, they are more and more considered as a danger for the economy and democracy by many researchers and could try to abuse certain positions within this future market. It will therefore be imperative to have a specific regulation, to the abuse of dominant positions. Finally, to reach its objectives, Europe is confronted with three challenges in particular: the concentration of players, tax evasion and inequalities linked to digital technology (digital fracture).

== See also ==
- EU law
- eIDAS
- Digital Europe Programme
