= Leonardo (supercomputer) =

Supercomputer in Italy

- Active: November 24, 2022
- Sponsors: European High-Performance Computing Joint Undertaking
- Operators: CINECA
- Location: Bologna, Italy
- Architecture: 13,824 Nvidia Ampere GPU cores
- Power: 6 MW
- Operating system: Red Hat Enterprise Linux (RHEL)
- Space: over 900 m^{2} (9,700 sq ft)
- Memory: 2.8 petabytes
- Storage: 110 petabytes
- Speed: 250 petaFLOPS (peak)
- Cost: €240 million
- Ranking: TOP500: 10, June 2025
- Website: Leonardo Pre-exascale Supercomputer

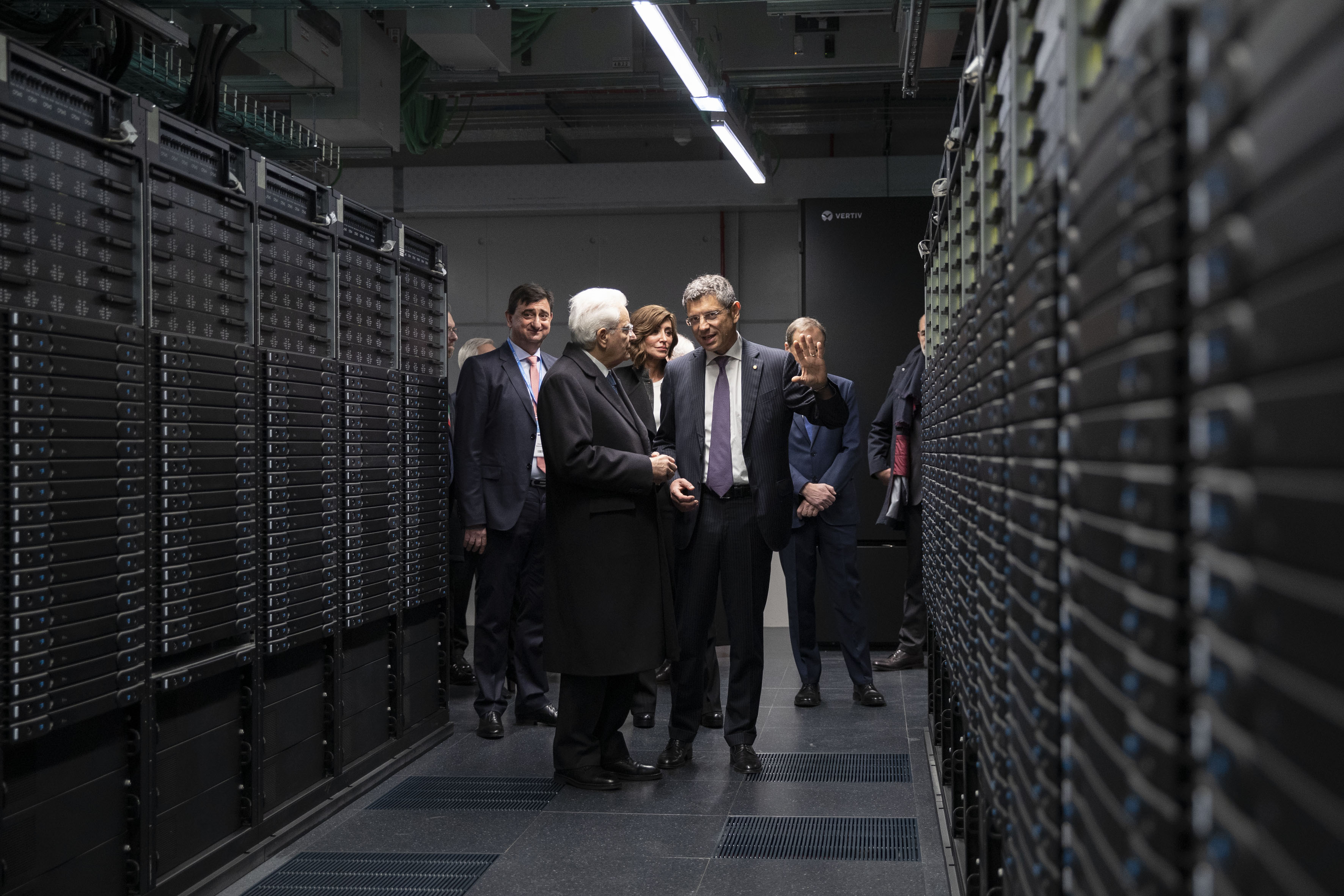
President of Italy Sergio Mattarella opening Leonardo

Leonardo is a petascale supercomputer located at the CINECA datacenter in Bologna, Italy. The system consists of an Atos BullSequana XH2000 computer, with close to 14,000 Nvidia Ampere GPUs and 200 Gbit/s Nvidia Mellanox HDR InfiniBand connectivity. Inaugurated in November 2022, Leonardo is capable of 250 petaflops (250 quadrillion operations per second), making it one of the top five fastest supercomputers in the world. It debuted on the TOP500 in November 2022 ranking fourth in the world, and second in Europe.

== Architecture ==
The system is constructed as three separate "modules". The first, known as the "booster module", consists of 13,824 Nvidia A100 GPUs, grouped four per node, for a total of 3,456 nodes. This module will be capable of 240.50 LINPACK petaflops, and is expected to be online by autumn 2022. The second module, called the "data centric module", is made up of 1,536 Intel Sapphire Rapids CPUs, and will be capable of 8.97 LINPACK petaflops. These two computing modules will be complemented by a "front-end & service module", and backed by two storage systems; 5 PB of high IOPS storage with 1 TB/s bandwidth and 100 PB of high capacity storage with 500 GB/s bandwidth. The components will be joined up by a 200 Gbit/s InfiniBand interconnect.

=== Booster Module ===
The 3,456 individual nodes which make up the "booster module" are custom BullSequana X2135 "Da Vinci" blade servers, each composed of:

- 1x Intel Xeon 8358 CPU, with 32 cores running at 2.6 GHz
- 512 GB RAM DDR4 3200 MHz
- 4x NVidia custom Ampere GPU, 64 GB HBM2
- 2x NVidia HDR InfiniBand network adapters, each with two 100 Gbit/s ports

Each node is expected to deliver 89.4 TFLOPs peak.

=== Data Centric Module ===
The "data centric module" consists of 1536 nodes, each comprising a BullSequana X2610 compute blade with:

- 2x Intel Sapphire Rapids CPUs, with 56 cores
- 512 GB RAM DDR5 4800 MHz
- 1x NVidia HDR InfiniBand network adapter, with one 100 Gbit/s port
- 8 TB NVM storage

=== Front-end & Service Module ===
This module is responsible for login handling, visualisation and system service and management. It consists of 16 nodes, each having:

- 2x Ice Lake CPUs, with 32 cores
- 512 GB RAM
- 1x NVidia HDR InfiniBand network adapter, with two 100 Gbit/s ports
- 6 TB disk storage in RAID-1 configuration

16 additional nodes are also equipped with:

- 2x NVidia Quadro RTX8000 48 GB (for visualisations)
- 6.4 TB NVMe disk array

=== Storage ===
Leonardo will have access to two storage tiers:

- A "fast" tier based on 31x DDN Exascaler ES400NVX2 appliances, each with 24x 7.68 TB NVMe SSDs
- A "capacity" tier based on 31x DDN EXAScaler SFA799X appliances, with 82x 18 TB HDD SAS 7200 rpm and two JBOD expansions per appliance, each with 82x 18 TB HDD SAS 7200 rpm

== Funding ==
Leonardo is part of the European High-Performance Computing Joint Undertaking, and receives €120 million in funding from the EU. This is matched by a further €120 million from the Italian Ministry of Education, University and Research.

== Bologna Technopole ==
The building housing Leonardo is known as the Bologna Technopole, and used to be home to a tobacco factory. It was built in 1952 by Pier Luigi Nervi, who was famous for his innovative use of reinforced concrete. In addition to Leonardo, the building also houses the European Centre for Medium-Range Weather Forecasts' new supercomputer, consisting of four Atos BullSequana XH2000 clusters, which replaces their earlier facility in Reading, England.

== See also ==
- LUMI, another EuroHPC supercomputer based in Kajaani, Finland.
- EuroHPC (European High-Performance Computing Joint Undertaking).
