= LUMI =

Supercomputer in Finland

- Active: June 13, 2022
- Sponsors: European High-Performance Computing Joint Undertaking, LUMI Consortium
- Location: Kajaani, Finland
- Architecture: 362,496 cores, AMD EPYC CPUs, 10,240 AMD Radeon Instinct MI250X GPUs (144,179,200 cores)
- Power: 7.1 MW
- Space: 150 m^{2}
- Memory: 1.75 petabytes
- Storage: 117 petabytes
- Speed: 379 petaFLOPS (Rmax) / 531 petaFLOPS (Rpeak)
- Cost: €144.5 million
- Ranking: TOP500: 9, June 2025
- Website: www.lumi-supercomputer.eu

LUMI (Large Unified Modern Infrastructure) is a petascale supercomputer located at the CSC data center in Kajaani, Finland. In January 2023, the computer became the fastest supercomputer in Europe.

The completed system consists of 362,496 cores, capable of executing more than 375 petaflops, with a theoretical peak performance of more than 550 petaflops, which places it among the most powerful computers in the world. The November 2022 TOP500 ranks LUMI at number five, with a measured performance of 309.1 PFLOPS.

== Architecture ==
The system is being supplied by Hewlett Packard Enterprise (HPE), providing an HPE Cray EX supercomputer with next generation 64-core AMD EPYC CPUs and AMD Radeon Instinct GPUs. LUMI is a GPU based system, and the majority of its computing power comes from its GPU cores, an architecture which was chosen primarily for its cost/performance advantage. The system is equipped with 1.75 petabytes of RAM, and storage includes a 7-petabyte partition of flash storage, combined with 80-petabytes of traditional storage, both based on the Lustre parallel file system, as well as a 30-petabyte data management service based on Ceph. This gives the system a total of 117 petabytes of storage with an aggregated I/O bandwidth of 2 terabytes per second.

== Funding ==
LUMI is co-funded by the EuroHPC Joint Undertaking and the LUMI Consortium, which is composed of the following countries: Finland, Belgium, Czech Republic, Denmark, Estonia, Iceland, Norway, the Netherlands, Poland, Sweden, and Switzerland. The total budget is €144.5 million.

== Energy ==
The computer uses 100% hydroelectric energy, and the heat it generates will be captured and used to heat buildings in the area, making LUMI one of the most environmentally efficient supercomputers in the world. The former UPM paper mill where LUMI is located had only a single 2 minute power outage during its 38 years of operations thanks to the site's reliable connection to the national grid.

== Operation ==
Half of LUMI's capacity belongs to the EuroHPC Joint Undertaking, 20% of which is reserved for industry and SME use. The other half is shared among the LUMI Consortium countries, according to each country’s financial contribution.

By June 2021 pilot projects had been selected for the first run of the CPU partition, scheduled for September 2021, with full operations including the GPU partition planned for 2022.

== Bull Contract ==
In August 31st 2026, the EuroHPC joint undertaking (EuroHPC JU) and the LUMI AI Factory consortium awarded the french state-owned company Bull a €387,8 million contract to design, deliver, install and maintain a new AI-optimised supercomputer.

== Naming ==
The word "lumi" means "snow" in Finnish.

== See also ==
- Leonardo, another EuroHPC supercomputer in Bologna, Italy
- EuroHPC (European High-Performance Computing Joint Undertaking).
