= CSC – IT Center for Science =

Finnish information technology company

CSC – IT Center for Science Ltd.
- Native name: CSC – Tieteen tietotekniikan keskus Oy
- Type: Non-profit state enterprise
- Founded: 1971; 55 years ago
- Headquarters: Espoo, Finland
- Area served: Finland
- Number of employees: 709 (2025)
- Website: csc.fi

CSC – IT Center for Science Ltd. (also known as Finnish IT Center for Science, natively CSC – Tieteen tietotekniikan keskus Oy) provides IT support and modeling, computing and information services for academia, research institutes and companies in Finland. It is owned by the Finnish state and Finnish higher education institutions, administered by the Ministry of Education and Culture, and operated on a non-profit principle. CSC has provided computational and network services since 1971.

The CSC servers create a common user environment. The service environment is made up of several supercomputers, database servers and information servers that are all linked together with a fast data transfer connection into one metacomputer. Extensive data and archive servers are available for saving results.

CSC also manages the FUNET network, which is the Finnish national research and education network that provides fast internet access to universities and other academic institutions as well as some governmental agencies.

== History ==
CSC’s origins are linked to the centralisation of Finnish state and university computing. The State Computer Centre (Valtion tietokonekeskus, VTKK) was established in 1964 and hosted the first mainframe computer used by Finnish universities. CSC’s operations began within VTKK in 1971 as a support unit for Finland’s first university central computer, a Univac system, and the unit’s role was to provide scientific computing and related IT services for higher education and research.

During the 1980s, CSC’s predecessor expanded from centralised computing into research networking. The Ministry of Education and Finnish universities began developing the Finnish University and Research Network, Funet, in the 1980s, and Finnish universities obtained international Internet connectivity through Funet in 1988. In 1989, the unit acquired Finland’s first supercomputer, a Cray X-MP, which became part of the national computing infrastructure for university research.

The unit was incorporated in 1993 as CSC – Tieteellinen laskenta Oy, or CSC – Scientific Computing Ltd. It later came under the ownership steering of the Ministry of Education and Culture. By the 2000s, CSC’s service portfolio had broadened beyond scientific computing and telecommunications to include software, data and information management services. In 2008, the company adopted the Finnish name CSC – Tieteen tietotekniikan keskus Oy and the English name CSC – IT Center for Science Ltd. to reflect this wider role.

In 2016, the Finnish Government approved a change in CSC’s ownership structure under which higher education institutions became minority shareholders. The state transferred 30 percent of the company’s shares to Finnish higher education institutions, while the Finnish state retained 70 percent. The change was intended to strengthen the ability of universities and universities of applied sciences to use CSC’s specialised ICT and computing services as part of their own operations.

CSC has since expanded as a national and European research-infrastructure provider. In addition to supercomputing and networking services for Finnish academia, research institutes, the public sector and industry, it has participated in European research infrastructure and data initiatives, including PRACE, the European Grid Infrastructure and the Research Data Alliance.

CSC represents Finland in the ELIXIR life-science infrastructure and hosts the EuroHPC LUMI supercomputer in Kajaani. In 2024, the European High Performance Computing Joint Undertaking selected the Finnish-led LUMI consortium to establish the LUMI AI Factory in Kajaani, with CSC as the host organisation.

== See also ==
- LUMI
