= Executive Agency for Small and Medium-sized Enterprises =

Executive Agency of the European Commission

The Executive Agency for Small and Medium-sized Enterprises (EASME) is an Executive Agency of the European Commission. EASME was founded in 2003 as the Intelligent Energy Executive Agency (IEEA) and was renamed the European Agency for Competitiveness and Innovation (EACI) in 2007, finally becoming EASME in 2014. It is responsible for managing specific programmes in the fields of energy, the environment, and business support. Its goal is to promote sustainable development while improving the competitiveness of European industries. While the Agency has its own legal identity, it reports to several Directorates-General of the European Commission, which remain responsible for programming and evaluation of the programmes.

== Organisation ==
The Agency was created in 2003 to implement the Intelligent Energy – Europe (IEE) programme, which seeks to foster market conditions for the development of new energy technology and is overseen by the European Commission's Energy Directorate-General. IEEA was the first Executive Agency to be established.

In 2007, its mandate was extended to include the Commission's 2007–2013 Competitiveness and Innovation Framework Programme 2007–2013 (CIP) and the Marco Polo Programme 2007–2013. It was also renamed EACI. In practice, this meant that the bulk of the Agency's work was split into three programmes from other DGs. It continued working on IEE. The agency then also became involved in the operations of the Eco-Innovation programme, which was overseen by DG Environment and provides assistance to pre-market environmental products. It also handled parts of the Marco Polo programme, which works to shift road haulage to rail and water transport, and was managed by DG Mobility and Transport.

In 2014, the agency changed its name to EASME, and it became responsible for other programmes in addition to IEE and Eco-Innovation. It currently handles the operations of parts of Horizon 2020, the EU Research and Innovation programme. EASME is also responsible for the majority of COSME, the EU programme for the Competitiveness of Enterprises and Small and Medium-sized Enterprises. It also operates part of LIFE, a financial instrument to support conservation and environmental actions in the EU. Finally, EASME is managing parts of the European Maritime and Fisheries Fund, which finances the EU's maritime and fisheries policies.

EASME is a temporary agency, initially established for a period beginning on 1 January 2004 and ending on 31 December 2008. This period has been extended to 2024.

== EU Sustainable Energy Week (EUSEW) ==
EASME works with the Energy Directorate-General to organise an annual event, the EU Sustainable Energy Week (EUSEW), which aims to bolster the development of renewables and greater energy efficiency through knowledge-sharing and the showcase of new ideas. EUSEW was first launched in 2006.

The Agency also helps give visibility to separate events through its Energy Days. These are organised by independent actors, and promoted by EASME.
