= Innovation and Networks Executive Agency =

Transport agency of the European Union

- Predecessor: Trans-European Transport Network Executive Agency
- Successor: European Climate, Infrastructure and Environment Executive Agency
- Formation: 31 December 2013
- Dissolved: 31 March 2021
- Location: Brussels, Belgium
- Director: Dirk Beckers

The Innovation and Networks Executive Agency (INEA) was an executive agency established by the European Commission in order to run the Connecting Europe Facility and parts of Horizon 2020, with legacy programmes of the Trans-European Transport Network (TEN-T) programme and the Marco Polo programme. It replaced the Trans-European Transport Network Executive Agency (TEN-T EA) on 31 December 2013.

The Agency was in charge of all open TEN-T projects. The projects represented all transport modes – air, rail, road, and maritime/sea – and logistics and intelligent transport systems, and involved all European Union member states. Its status as an executive agency meant that, although independent, INEA was closely linked with its parent, the Directorate-General for Mobility and Transport (DG MOVE). DG MOVE dealt with all policy-making issues related to the TEN-T programme, while the INEA existed to execute the programme's specific tasks.

The Innovation and Networks Executive Agency (INEA) ended its operations on 31 March 2021 and was replaced by the European Climate, Infrastructure and Environment Executive Agency (CINEA).
