= Connecting Europe Facility =

European Union fund for infrastructure investments

The Connecting Europe Facility (CEF) is a European Union fund established in 2014 for infrastructure investments (in particular the Trans-European Networks) across the union in transport, energy, digital and telecommunication projects, which aims at a greater connectivity between EU member states. It operates through grants, financial guarantees and project bonds. It is run by the Innovation and Networks Executive Agency and then by the Climate, Infrastructure and Environment Executive Agency.

== CEF Digital ==
CEF Digital is the digital infrastructure arm of CEF.

A large portion of CEF Digital was split off in 2021 to form the Digital Europe Programme.

The actions which remain assigned to CEF Digital after 2021, include:

- Deploying very high-capacity networks, including 5G systems, in areas where socioeconomic drivers are located
- Guaranteeing uninterrupted coverage with 5G systems of all major transport paths, including the trans-European transport networks
- Deploying new or a significant upgrade of existing backbone networks, including submarine cables, within and between Member States and between the Union and third countries
- Implementing and supporting digital connectivity infrastructure related to cross-border projects in the areas of transport or energy

== See also ==
- High Speed 2 (England)
