= Artificial intelligence industry in the United Kingdom =

In 2024, the United Kingdom ranked sixth in the world and second in Europe by the number of AI-related patents.

As of 2025, the artificial intelligence (AI) market in the United Kingdom is worth over £21 billion, and is expected to exceed £1 trillion by 2035. It is the world's third-largest AI market and consistently ranked 3rd in private AI funding between 2013 and 2024, both behind the United States and China. The country ranked fifth globally in a 2024 report on AI development by Stanford University. In the first (2024) edition of GIRAI, the United Kingdom was ranked 4th out of 138 countries assessed and in the second (2026) edition, the country rank fell to 7th out of 135 countries. The UK's prominence is rooted in a strong historical foundation, beginning with Alan Turing's theoretical work in the 1930s and 1940s, and the establishment of early AI research centres in the 1960s, such as those at the University of Edinburgh. Despite periods of reduced funding known as "AI winters", modern UK AI research has seen significant breakthroughs, most notably through London-based DeepMind's achievements in deep reinforcement learning and protein structure prediction.

The UK AI sector has experienced rapid growth. The number of AI companies increased by 85% between 2022 and 2024, reaching 5,862 firms. In 2024, the sector generated an estimated £23.9 billion in revenue and £11.8 billion in Gross Value Added (GVA), employing over 86,000 people. The industry is predominantly composed of small and medium-sized enterprises (SMEs) and is heavily concentrated geographically, with 75% of registered AI company offices located in London, the South East, and the East of England. Investment in dedicated UK AI companies reached a record £2.9 billion in 2024, driven largely by international investors. However, the sector faces a persistent "scale-up gap" for companies seeking growth capital beyond the Series A stage, as well as a critical skills shortage, particularly in technical roles and understanding AI concepts.

The National AI Strategy (2021) laid out a ten-year plan to invest in the AI ecosystem, support adoption, and establish a governance framework. In 2023, the UK hosted the inaugural global AI Safety Summit, leading to the Bletchley Declaration and the establishment of the AI Security Institute (AISI) to evaluate frontier AI models. The 2025 AI Opportunities Action Plan set strategic goals to secure computing infrastructure, drive public sector adoption, and build domestic AI capabilities, supported by a £2 billion investment in AI infrastructure and the creation of "AI Growth Zones". In contrast to the European Union's comprehensive AI Act, the UK has adopted a "pro-innovation", sector-specific regulatory approach. Rather than creating a single AI regulator, the UK relies on existing bodies (such as the Competition and Markets Authority, Information Commissioner, and Financial Conduct Authority) to apply cross-cutting principles to AI systems within their domains. The UK's light-touch regulatory approach has drawn criticism for potentially leaving the public inadequately protected. Organisations like the Ada Lovelace Institute argue for a statutory AI Bill to mandate pre-deployment testing and empower regulators, citing public polling that strongly supports independent regulation. The impact of AI on the labour market is another major concern. Reports suggest that up to three million UK jobs could be displaced by 2035, with lower-skilled and entry-level positions particularly vulnerable. Trade unions, including the Trades Union Congress and Prospect, have raised alarms about the rise of algorithmic management and workplace surveillance, calling for a "pro-worker" AI strategy and the right to disconnect. Furthermore, there are concerns about the UK's dependence on US technology infrastructure, which some argue threatens economic competitiveness and national security, leading to calls for greater "digital sovereignty".

The UK faces intense debate over AI developers training models on copyrighted material. Following strong opposition from the creative sector and trade unions, the government abandoned a 2024 proposal that would have allowed broad text and data mining (TDM) with only an "opt-out" for creators. Conversely, academia and libraries argue that narrow TDM exceptions restrict research. They criticise major publishers for charging universities to access research while simultaneously selling that same data to commercial AI developers, often steering authors towards restrictive licences to retain exclusive commercial rights.

The rapid expansion of AI infrastructure has significant environmental implications. The energy demands of data centres are projected to grow substantially, potentially conflicting with the UK's net-zero targets and straining grid capacity. Additionally, the water consumption required for cooling data centres has raised sustainability concerns. Beyond domestic impacts, the global AI supply chain relies heavily on the extraction of critical minerals (such as cobalt and lithium) in the Global South, often associated with environmental degradation and human rights abuses. The development of AI models also depends on low-wage "ghost workers" in developing nations for data annotation and content moderation, prompting calls for mandatory human rights due diligence laws.

While economic forecasts suggest AI could significantly boost UK GDP and productivity, realising these gains faces a "productivity paradox". Despite experimental evidence of productivity improvements, economy-wide data does not yet reflect an AI-driven boost, largely due to low adoption rates of bespoke systems among traditional businesses and the concentration of economic value among a small percentage of organisations. Furthermore, economists warn of "algorithmic rents", where dominant tech platforms extract wealth, potentially eroding the UK tax base and exacerbating market concentration. The UK's Digital Services Tax (DST) attempts to address this but remains controversial with the US government.

== History ==
The British computer scientist Alan Turing laid the theoretical groundwork for artificial intelligence. His foundational 1936 paper on the Entscheidungsproblem introduced the concept of the universal computing machine. Turing's wartime efforts at Bletchley Park involved developing the Bombe, an electromechanical device that utilized heuristic search techniques to decipher Enigma codes. In 1950, Turing published his seminal paper "Computing Machinery and Intelligence" in the journal Mind, where he proposed the "Imitation Game" (now known as the Turing Test) as a criterion for machine intelligence. This period established Britain as a global leader in early computational theory and machine intelligence.

During the 1960s, the UK established AI research centers, most notably at the University of Edinburgh. In 1963, Donald Michie founded a small research group that later evolved into the Department of Machine Intelligence and Perception. Michie's team developed the Freddy robots (Freddy I and Freddy II), which were early examples of robots capable of integrating vision and manipulation to assemble objects. Researchers such as Robert Kowalski at the University of Edinburgh and later Imperial College London made significant contributions to logic programming, laying the theoretical foundations for the Prolog programming language.

However, the optimism of the 1960s was curtailed by the 1973 Lighthill Report. Commissioned by the Science Research Council and authored by Sir James Lighthill, the report provided a highly critical assessment of AI research, arguing that it had failed to achieve its "grandiose objectives". The report led to a severe reduction in government funding for AI in the UK, precipitating what is often referred to as the first "AI winter".

In response to Japan's Fifth Generation Computer Systems initiative, the UK government launched the Alvey Programme in 1983. This five-year, £350 million collaborative R&D initiative aimed to revitalize the British IT sector, with a significant focus on Intelligent Knowledge Based Systems (IKBS), or expert systems. While the programme succeeded in fostering collaboration between academia and industry, it struggled to translate pre-competitive research into commercial success, leading to a second period of reduced funding and enthusiasm in the late 1980s and early 1990s.

The modern era of UK AI research is characterised by significant breakthroughs in deep learning and reinforcement learning, commercialised by the London-based company DeepMind. Founded in 2010 by Demis Hassabis, Shane Legg, and Mustafa Suleyman, DeepMind achieved global recognition for its work on deep reinforcement learning. In 2015, they published a landmark paper in Nature demonstrating an AI agent capable of learning to play Atari 2600 games at a human level directly from sensory input.

DeepMind's AlphaGo system subsequently made history in 2016 by defeating Lee Sedol, a world champion Go player, marking a major milestone in AI capabilities. In 2020, DeepMind's AlphaFold accurately predicted 3D protein structures from amino acid sequences, a contribution to structural biology that earned its creators the Nobel Prize in Chemistry.

== Industry overview ==
=== Scale and economic contribution ===
According to the UK Government's Artificial Intelligence Sector Study 2024, commissioned by the Department for Science, Innovation and Technology (DSIT) and conducted by Perspective Economics, the UK AI sector comprised 5,862 companies in 2024, representing an 85% increase compared to 2022 and a 58% increase compared to 2023. The sector generated an estimated £23.9 billion in revenue in 2024, a 68% increase from £14.2 billion in 2023. Gross Value Added (GVA) reached £11.8 billion, more than doubling from £5.8 billion in 2023. Employment in AI-related roles grew by 33% to 86,139 in 2024, compared to 64,539 in 2023 and 50,040 in 2022.

UK AI sector key metrics (2022–2024)
Metric	2022	2023	2024
Number of companies	3,170	3,713	5,862
Revenue (£ billion)	£10.6bn	£14.2bn	£23.9bn
Gross value added (£ billion)	£3.7bn	£5.8bn	£11.8bn
Employment (FTE)	50,040	64,539	86,139
Investment in dedicated firms	£2.4bn	£1.5bn	£2.9bn

The sector is composed of both "dedicated" AI companies, those for which AI is the primary revenue source, and "diversified" companies, which offer AI products and services as part of a broader commercial offering. In 2024, 56% of identified firms were dedicated and 44% were diversified, with the share of diversified companies continuing to grow year-on-year, reflecting the increasing integration of AI across the wider economy. The vast majority (95%) of all identified AI companies are small and medium-sized enterprises (SMEs), with micro-businesses (fewer than 10 employees) accounting for 70% of the sector.

=== Geographic distribution ===
AI activity is heavily concentrated in London and the South East. In 2024, London, the South East, and the East of England accounted for approximately 75% of all registered AI company offices. London has been described by industry investors as "the third largest city in the world for starting AI companies". However, the number of AI firms is growing across all UK regions, with annual growth rates of between 20% and 50%, and at least double the number of AI companies now operating in the West Midlands, North West, East Midlands, Wales, and Yorkshire and Humber compared to 2022.

=== Key companies and sectors ===
The UK is home to several globally significant AI organisations. Google DeepMind, headquartered in London, is one of the world's foremost AI research laboratories and is responsible for landmark achievements including AlphaFold, which computationally solved the protein folding problem. Other prominent UK-headquartered or UK-based AI companies include Darktrace (cybersecurity), Wayve (autonomous vehicles), Synthesia (AI video generation), Tractable (insurance and damage assessment), and Featurespace (fraud detection). The UK is also a significant base for major international AI companies, including OpenAI, Anthropic, Microsoft, and Meta, all of which maintain substantial UK AI operations.

=== Investment ===
Investment in dedicated UK AI companies rebounded to £2.9 billion in 2024, surpassing the previous record of £2.4 billion set in 2022 and recovering strongly from a trough of £1.5 billion in 2023. The average deal size rose to approximately £5.9 million in 2024, compared to £4.6 million in 2022. International investors, including Microsoft, Nvidia, and SoftBank, continue to provide the largest investment contributions.

In 2024, there were 51 AI-related inward investment projects into the UK, representing over £15 billion in capital investment and expected to create more than 6,500 jobs. These were dominated by infrastructure investments from Amazon, Google, CoreWeave, and Vantage Data Centres.

Despite this growth, qualitative research conducted for the Sector Study identified a persistent "scale-up gap": the UK is described as "very good at the start phase, but [at] the scale up phase (beyond Series A), there's a missing piece there". More than half of dedicated AI companies identified in 2024 are at the seed stage of development, showing a healthy start-up scene, but investors cited a lack of larger-scale growth capital, risk aversion among existing UK investors, and insufficient uptake of pension fund investment in venture capital as key structural barriers.

=== AI skills shortage ===
The UK AI sector faces a critical and worsening skills shortage. The AI Labour Market Survey 2025, commissioned by DSIT and published in January 2026, found that 97% of surveyed organisations identified at least one gap in AI-related skills in the labour market, and that 57% reported a technical skills gap. The most significant gap identified was in understanding AI concepts and algorithms, with 28% of organisations reporting that technical skills shortages had directly impacted their ability to achieve business goals. Women account for only 20% of AI roles, a figure that has fallen by four percentage points since 2020, and 41% of firms do not employ people from minority ethnic backgrounds, exacerbating the talent pipeline constraint through underrepresentation.

== Government AI strategy ==
=== National AI Strategy (2021) ===
The UK Government's National AI Strategy, was published in September 2021 under the Conservative government of Boris Johnson. It set out a ten-year plan structured around three pillars: investing in the long-term needs of the AI ecosystem; supporting the adoption of AI across all sectors of the economy; and establishing an effective governance framework that ensures AI is safe, ethical, and trustworthy. The strategy identified the UK's world-class universities, research base, and existing technology cluster as competitive advantages to be leveraged.

=== AI Safety Summit and the AI Safety Institute (2023) ===
In November 2023, the UK hosted the inaugural global AI Safety Summit at Bletchley Park, the historic home of wartime codebreaking. The summit brought together representatives from 28 countries, major AI companies, and civil society organisations to address the risks posed by frontier AI systems through mandatory and voluntary regulatory frameworks.. The summit produced the Bletchley Declaration, a landmark international agreement recognising the potential for "catastrophic" harm from AI and committing signatories to cooperative risk assessment and safety research.

The United Kingdom founded in April 2023 a safety organisation called Frontier AI Taskforce, with an initial budget of £100 million. In November 2023, it evolved into the AI Security Institute (AISI), and continued to be led by Ian Hogarth. The AISI is part of the United Kingdom's Department for Science, Innovation and Technology. The AISI's mandate encompasses developing and conducting evaluations on frontier AI models, driving foundational safety research, and equipping governments with empirical understanding of advanced AI risks.

=== AI Opportunities Action Plan (2025) ===
In January 2025, Prime Minister Keir Starmer's Labour government published the AI Opportunities Action Plan, an independent report commissioned from technology entrepreneur Matt Clifford and presented to Parliament by the Secretary of State for Science, Innovation and Technology. The plan acknowledged that while the UK is the third-largest AI market globally, it "risks falling behind the advances in Artificial Intelligence made in the USA and China".

The plan is structured around three strategic goals:

1. Lay the foundations to enable AI: securing world-class computing and data infrastructure, access to talent, and an appropriate regulatory environment. Key commitments include expanding the AI Research Resource (AIRR) by at least 20 times by 2030, establishing "AI Growth Zones" (AIGZs) to accelerate the build-out of AI data centres through streamlined planning and power provisioning, and developing a sovereign AI compute capability.
2. Change lives by embracing AI: driving rapid AI adoption in the public sector, including in the National Health Service, education, and government administration, to improve public services and boost productivity.
3. Secure our future with homegrown AI: positioning the UK as a partner of choice for frontier AI developers and building domestic AI companies that operate at multiple layers of the "AI stack", to ensure the UK benefits economically and has influence over the values and governance of future AI systems.

The government projected that AI adoption could grow the UK economy by an additional £400 billion by 2030 and committed to a £2 billion investment in AI infrastructure.

The UK government has proposed a plan to boost the country's AI infrastructure and expand its use in public services, with the UK Prime Minister Keir Starmer saying that the country would become one of the "AI superpowers".

The United Kingdom's AI strategy aims to balance safety and innovation; unlike the European Union which adopted the AI Act, the UK is reluctant to legislate early, considering that it may lower the sector's growth, and that laws might be rendered obsolete by technological progress.

=== AI Growth Zones and Compute Roadmap ===
Following the Action Plan, the government published its AI Growth Zones policy paper in November 2025, designating specific sites, with streamlined planning approvals and accelerated power connections. The policy aims to reduce the time to power for new data centres by up to five years and save a 500 MW data centre up to £80 million annually.

In July 2025, the UK government published its UK Compute Roadmap outlining up to £2 billion for a modern public compute ecosystem and a 20-fold expansion of the AI Research Resource by 2030, alongside AI Growth Zones.

=== Partnerships and investments from US companies ===
Also in July, the UK government signed a deal with OpenAI to use its products in public services to increase productivity.

As part of the 2025 Tech Prosperity Deal between the UK and the US, several American companies are investing tens of billions of pounds in British AI infrastructure.

=== AI Sovereignty and National Security (2026) ===
In April 2026, Technology Secretary Liz Kendall delivered a landmark speech at the Royal United Services Institute (RUSI), declaring that "control over where AI systems are built, how they operate and who ultimately controls them is now fundamental to economic security, energy security and defence security". The government announced plans to develop a UK AI hardware plan to secure Britain's capability in chips and semiconductor technologies, framing AI sovereignty not as isolationism but as ensuring the UK is "indispensable" in the global AI architecture.

The government also established a Sovereign AI Fund. The fund is designed to invest directly in early-stage and growth-stage British AI companies, aiming to ensure the UK remains competitive in the global AI sector. the fund is managed by Suzanne Ashman.

=== Regulatory approach ===
Unlike the European Union, which enacted the comprehensive, risk-based EU AI Act (Regulation (EU) 2024/1689), the UK has maintained a "pro-innovation" and sector-specific regulatory approach. Rather than creating a single AI regulator or primary legislation, the UK relies on existing sector-specific regulator, including the Competition and Markets Authority (CMA), the Information Commissioner's Office (ICO), the Financial Conduct Authority (FCA), and Ofcom, to apply cross-cutting principles of safety, transparency, fairness, accountability, and contestability to AI systems within their respective domains.

== Criticisms and concerns ==
=== Regulatory gaps and the absence of statutory safeguards ===
A central criticism of UK AI policy is that its light-touch, pro-innovation regulatory stance leaves the public inadequately protected from AI-related harms. The Ada Lovelace Institute, an independent research body, has argued that the UK "lacks a comprehensive legal framework to govern AI systems" and that many harmful AI capabilities "arise during the design and development of AI systems — where few rules apply and few regulators have oversight". The Institute has called for a statutory AI Bill that mandates pre-deployment testing for general-purpose AI systems, empowers regulators to withdraw unsafe models from the UK market, and requires developers to disclose known risks, environmental impacts, and mitigation measures.

Research published by the Ada Lovelace Institute in December 2025, based on a nationally representative poll, found that 89% of the UK public support the establishment of an independent regulator for AI equipped with enforcement powers, and that 91% believe it is important that AI systems are developed and used in ways that treat people fairly. Critically, 84% of respondents feared that the government would prioritise its partnerships with large technology companies over the public interest when regulating AI. The Institute's UK Public Policy Lead, Nuala Polo, stated: "Our research is clear: there is a major misalignment between what the UK public want and what the government is offering in terms of AI regulation."

=== Labour market and workers' rights ===
The potential impact of AI on employment is a significant area of public and policy concern. A report by the National Foundation for Educational Research (NFER) published in November 2025 estimated that up to three million UK jobs in declining occupations could disappear by 2035, largely due to AI and automation, with the effects concentrated among lower-skilled workers.

The UK Government's own Assessment of AI Capabilities and the Impact on the UK Labour Market, published by the AI Security Institute in January 2026, found that approximately 70% of UK workers are in occupations containing tasks that AI could potentially perform or enhance, a higher share than the US and other advanced economies, reflecting the UK's service-sector-intensive economy. The report also noted that UK job postings had declined more sharply in occupations with higher AI exposure, with analysis from McKinsey finding that between 2022 and 2025, UK job adverts fell by 38% for high-exposure occupations compared to 21% for low-exposure roles. However, the report cautioned that these patterns are "suggestive, but do not yet establish that AI is the cause of the decline", noting that AI exposure is correlated with other factors such as interest rate sensitivity and sector-specific economic shocks.

Separately, research by British Progress published in April 2026 found "no evidence that [AI] has replaced jobs at scale in the UK" over the preceding three years, though it noted that wages in highly AI-exposed occupations grew more slowly than in less-exposed roles. A British Chamber of Commerce survey found that 95% of SMEs using generic AI tools reported no impact on headcount over the previous 12 months. However, among the minority of firms adopting bespoke AI systems, 21% reported a decrease in headcount, suggesting that deeper AI integration leads to organisational restructuring.

==== Productivity and adoption rates ====
While experimental studies show substantial productivity improvements for workers assisted by AI, such as software developers completing tasks 26% faster and mid-level professionals spending 40% less time on routine writing, these gains have not yet translated into economy-wide productivity growth in the UK. McKinsey & Company describes this as the "new productivity paradox", noting that over the past year, the largest contributions to UK productivity growth came from sectors with relatively low AI exposure, such as retail and facilities management.

This paradox is partly explained by adoption patterns. A March 2026 survey by the British Chambers of Commerce (BCC) found that while AI adoption among SMEs had accelerated to 54% (up from 25% in 2024), most firms were using generic tools (like chatbots) rather than deeply integrated, bespoke systems. Furthermore, a 2026 global study by PwC showed that nearly 74% of AI's economic value is being captured by just 20% of organisations, being those that use AI to reinvent business models and pursue growth, rather than merely seeking cost reductions.

==== Distributional effects and inequality ====
The impact of AI is not distributed evenly across the workforce. There is growing evidence of a "hollowing out" of entry-level positions. Data from job platform Adzuna in late 2025 showed a 24.7% year-on-year decline in advertised entry-level jobs in the UK, as businesses increasingly use AI to perform tasks traditionally assigned to junior staff. This raises concerns about the future talent pipeline and the ability of young people to enter the labour market.

Furthermore, AI automation poses specific risks to gender equality. A 2026 white paper by the Fawcett Society highlighted that automation and AI could displace up to 40% of women in certain industries by 2030, as women are disproportionately concentrated in administrative and clerical roles highly exposed to automation. The report also warned that AI systems trained on historically unequal labour-market data risk embedding and scaling existing gender pay disparities and occupational segregation.

==== Automation and workplace surveillance ====
The TUC has warned against the "uncritical use" of AI and algorithmic management in the workplace. In 2022, the TUC published a report stated that intrusive worker surveillance technology was "spiralling out of control", noting that 60% of workers believed they had been subject to surveillance at their current or most recent job. The TUC highlighted that AI-powered technologies were increasingly being used to analyse facial expressions, tone of voice, and accents during recruitment, and to make automated decisions regarding shift allocation and redundancies.

In August 2025, the TUC launched its "worker first" AI strategy, titled Building a Pro-Worker AI Innovation Strategy. The strategy called for a "digital dividend" to ensure workers share in the productivity gains generated by AI. The TUC's demands included:

- Placing workers at the heart of changes made, including through workers being placed on company boards
- The implementation of a "right to disconnect" to prevent AI-enabled remote working from creating an "always-on" culture.
- Attaching "good work" conditions to public funding for AI research and development.

The TUC has also drafted a model Artificial Intelligence (Regulation and Employment Rights) Bill, designed to fill the regulatory gap left by the UK's divergence from EU data protection standards and the absence of a domestic equivalent to the EU AI Act.

Prospect, the union representing scientists, engineers, and tech workers, has campaigned for civil servants and technical professionals to have a voice in the rollout of AI. Prospect has highlighted the risks of an "always-on" culture, of the prevalence of workplace surveillance, and the need for workers to have ownership over the data collected about them by their employers.

==== Employee opposition to AI militarisation ====
In May 2026, workers at Google DeepMind's London headquarters voted to unionise, requesting joint representation by the Communication Workers Union (CWU) and Unite the Union. The unionisation drive was heavily motivated by ethical concerns regarding Google's military-industrial AI contracts, specifically the provision of AI technology to the US Department of Defense and the Israeli military.

=== Technological sovereignty and dependence on US infrastructure ===
A growing concern among UK AI businesses and policymakers is the country's dependence on foreign, primarily US, technology infrastructure. The UK AI Sector Study 2024 found that AI businesses, particularly those working on advanced or sensitive applications, expressed concerns about their reliance on US cloud infrastructure and large language models (LLMs), noting risks from "protectionist policies and trade disputes, access to cloud infrastructure, or pricing rates for services set by the major providers".

The Tony Blair Institute for Global Change warned in a 2025 report that the UK holds only approximately 3% of the world's computing power, creating a structural dependency that threatens both economic competitiveness and national security. The University of Cambridge's ai@cam initiative similarly warned that the UK's £2 billion AI investment and partnerships with leading US technology companies, while significant, may be insufficient to secure meaningful AI sovereignty given the scale of investment in the US and China.

In April 2026, a cross-party group of MPs warned of "glaring risks" in the UK's reliance on US technology providers, with heightened concerns that the Trump administration could leverage foreign countries' dependence on American tech infrastructure for geopolitical purposes.

=== Copyright licencing and text and data mining exceptions ===
The debate over AI developers training models on copyrighted material without consent is highly contentious in the UK. In 2024, the government proposed a broad text and data mining (TDM) exception allowing AI companies to use publicly available copyrighted material. This faced intense opposition from the creative sector.

In March 2026, the House of Lords Communications and Digital Committee concluded that generative AI poses a "clear and present danger" to the creative industries. Trade unions campaigned against the proposals, leading the government to abandon the "opt-out" model. The government acknowledged the need to build an evidence base before reforming copyright law.

==== Universities, libraries, and academic research ====
Conversely, academia and libraries are concerned that narrow copyright and TDM exceptions restrict access to research for AI training. Major academic publishers restrict universities from using subscribed databases for AI training without permission, while simultaneously selling access to commercial AI developers. This creates a "triple payment" problem where publicly funded research is paid for multiple times by universities.

Advocacy groups argue publishers use contract law to override statutory rights, hindering the UK's sovereign AI research capacity. In response, Jisc advised universities to resist restrictive AI clauses in publisher licences. The UK's TDM exception is limited to non-commercial research, which groups like Knowledge Rights 21 argue will hobble the UK's "AI for Science" strategy.

==== Academic licencing, licence steering and AI commercialisation ====
The use of academic research for Large Language Models (LLMs) has sparked debate within the Open Access movement. Academics accuse publishers of steering authors towards restrictive licences to retain exclusive commercial rights for AI training deals. In 2024, publishers like Taylor & Francis announced lucrative AI training partnerships, often without consulting authors. This dynamic complicates copyright litigation, as seen in the US when Elsevier sued Meta over Llama AI models, acting as the class representative due to exclusive commercial rights granted by authors.

== Environmental, energy and human rights impacts ==
The rapid expansion of the UK's artificial intelligence sector has raised significant concerns regarding its environmental footprint, particularly concerning electricity demand, carbon emissions, and water consumption. The UK's electricity grid faces capacity constraints that may limit the pace of data centre construction, and high industrial energy costs relative to competitor nations have been identified as a barrier to investment.

=== Electricity demand and grid capacity ===
The proliferation of AI has driven a surge in data centre construction and power requirements. According to the National Energy System Operator (NESO), UK data centres consumed 5.0 TWh of electricity in 2023, equivalent to 2% of total UK electricity demand and 7% of commercial sector consumption. However, Oxford Economics forecasts that total demand could grow more than fivefold by 2030, reaching 26.2 TWh, which would represent 8.8% of total UK electricity demand and 30.4% of commercial electricity consumption.

This rapid growth has created friction with the UK's net zero targets. In February 2026, the Environmental Audit Committee raised concerns that the government had not adequately factored data centre energy consumption into the draft Seventh Carbon Budget. The energy regulator Ofgem disclosed that developers of new data centres had enquired about grid connections that would require more energy at peak times than the whole of Britain consumes on some days.

=== Carbon emissions ===
Estimates of the carbon footprint of UK AI infrastructure have been subject to significant upward revision. In April 2026, the Department for Science, Innovation and Technology (DSIT) published corrected figures in its Compute Evidence Annex, estimating that UK greenhouse gas emissions from AI compute over the ten years from 2025 to 2035 could range from 34 to 123 MtCO₂. This represents around 0.9% to 3.4% of the UK's projected total emissions over that period. The government noted that these indirect emissions depend heavily on how quickly the UK decarbonises its energy grid; if the plan to have clean sources produce at least 95% of Great Britain's generation by 2030 is successful, emissions would fall towards the bottom of this range.

Conversely, some studies suggest that digital substitution can offset physical energy use. A 2025 report by Europe Economics for the Department for Energy Security and Net Zero found that in specific use cases, such as AI-powered translation versus human translation, the digital option either matched or substantially undercut the electricity use of the physical alternative across the full delivery chain.

=== Water consumption ===
Data centres also require substantial volumes of water for cooling servers. Data centres, which house the servers and computing equipment necessary for training and running AI models, are highly resource-intensive. The Ada Lovelace Institute has highlighted that AI data centres consume between 11 and 19 million litres of water per day, and that UK water regulators have already raised concerns about the sustainability of this demand. However, industry data claims a shift towards more sustainable practices. A 2025 report by techUK, based on a survey of 73 commercial data centres in England, found that 51% of surveyed sites used waterless cooling systems, and 64% used less than 10,000 cubic metres of water per year—less than a typical leisure centre. Despite these efficiencies, the absolute growth in the number of facilities continues to place pressure on local water resources, prompting calls for standardised AI chip cooling requirements and early coordination with water companies.

=== Global supply chain and human rights impacts ===
While domestic debates regarding artificial intelligence in the UK often focus on regulation, copyright, and local labour markets, environmental organisations, human rights groups, and academics have increasingly highlighted the UK's responsibility for the global supply chain impacts of AI. This critique focuses on two primary areas: the environmental and human rights costs of extracting critical minerals for AI hardware, and the exploitation of low-wage "ghost workers" in the Global South for data annotation and content moderation.

==== Mineral extraction and hardware footprint ====
The physical infrastructure of AI, specifically the Graphics Processing Units (GPUs) and data centres required to train and run large language models, relies heavily on critical minerals and rare earth elements. A 2026 study published in Nature Communications Earth & Environment quantified the material footprint of AI training, revealing that AI hardware consists of approximately 90% heavy metals. The study estimated that training a single large language model requires the equivalent lifetime consumption of between 1,760 and 8,800 GPUs, underscoring that incremental model performance gains come at disproportionately high material costs.

The extraction of these minerals, such as cobalt, lithium, tantalum, and coltan, is heavily concentrated in the Global South and is frequently associated with severe environmental degradation and human rights abuses. For example, the Democratic Republic of Congo (DRC) holds roughly 70% of the world's cobalt reserves, alongside vast deposits of coltan and copper. Academic analyses note that the global AI supply chain relies on a familiar geopolitical division of labour: African countries mine the raw materials, while Western and East Asian economies refine them and capture the technological value.

In the UK, a coalition of NGOs including Friends of the Earth, the Trade Justice Movement, and the London Mining Network published a joint report in May 2026 criticising the UK Government's critical minerals agenda. The report argued that the UK's top-down strategy is driving vast increases in mineral demands with devastating impacts for mining-affected communities, and called for policies geared towards minimising the UK's overall mineral demands and tackling the impunity of British-listed mining corporations. Similarly, the Centre for International Governance Innovation (CIGI) has warned that the infrastructure of AI exposes a host of hidden environmental security issues, requiring international cooperation that accounts for sustainability and labour standards.

==== Data annotation and "ghost workers" ====
Beyond hardware, the development of AI models relies on massive amounts of human labour to label data, train algorithms, and moderate content. This work is frequently outsourced to business process outsourcing (BPO) firms operating in the Global South, particularly in countries like Kenya, Ethiopia, and Colombia.

These data labourers, often referred to as "ghost workers", operate in what researchers describe as "digital sweatshops". Workers frequently report exploitative conditions, including low pay (sometimes as little as $2 an hour), forced unpaid overtime, and a lack of job security. Furthermore, content moderators are routinely exposed to graphic, violent, and hateful material in order to train AI safety filters. A 2025 Equidem survey of data workers documented widespread psychological harm, including PTSD, anxiety, and depression resulting from this exposure.

In the UK, development experts and technology associations have argued that the UK has a responsibility to address these supply chain abuses. The Institute of Development Studies (IDS) has warned that the uncritical use of AI in international development is morally dubious, noting that AI is often built on "stolen data" labelled using the exploited labour of women in low-income countries. The IDS advocates for a "Responsible AI" approach that removes worker exploitation from the supply chain and ensures fair work practices.

Furthermore, techUK, the UK's technology trade association, has criticised the UK Government for falling behind on supply chain regulation. While the UK was an early leader with the Modern Slavery Act 2015, techUK argues that the law has become an obsolete "reporting law" that allows companies to merely state they are doing nothing. They have called for the UK to adopt mandatory human rights due diligence laws, similar to the EU's Corporate Sustainability Due Diligence Directive, to force technology companies to meaningfully investigate and address human rights abuses.

== Prospects ==
=== Economic forecasts ===
The economic potential of AI in the UK is claimed to be substantial. PwC has estimated that AI could increase UK GDP by 10.3% by 2030, equivalent to approximately £232 billion of additional economic value, primarily through productivity augmentation in the service sector. The UK Government's own AI Opportunities Action Plan projected that AI adoption could grow the economy by an additional £400 billion by 2030. OECD estimates suggest UK labour productivity growth from AI could reach 0.4–1.2 percentage points annually over the next decade.

However, realising these gains faces what McKinsey & Company has termed a "productivity paradox". Research published in February 2026 found that while AI has demonstrated substantial productivity gains in experimental settings and for specific occupations (such as software developers, writers, and consultants), UK-wide productivity data does not yet reflect an AI-driven boost, due to low adoption rates among traditional businesses, organisational inertia, and the time required for firms to restructure workflows around new technologies.

=== Global competitive position ===
The UK's competitive position in AI is strong relative to most nations but faces structural challenges in competing with the US and China. London has been identified as the leading city in Europe for AI company formation, ahead of Berlin, Paris, and Stockholm. The UK's academic base is a key strength: three of the world's top ten universities are British, and qualitative research for the Sector Study found that investors regard UK universities as a primary source of commercially valuable AI innovation.

In comparative terms, the UK's pro-innovation regulatory approach has attracted more AI investment than the more heavily regulated EU environment, though critics argue this comes at the cost of consumer protection and public trust. France, which has pursued a more state-led AI strategy with significant public investment, ranked fifth in the Global AI Index in 2024 and attracted 30% of all European venture capital dedicated to AI. Germany, with its emphasis on industrial AI adoption, has achieved an AI adoption rate of 11.6% among companies, above the EU average of 8%, and projects its AI market to reach €37 billion by 2031.

The UK's strategy increasingly focuses on "accelerated diversification", meaning deploying AI across healthcare, education, and science, and on building sovereign capabilities in specific layers of the AI stack where the UK has genuine competitive advantages, rather than attempting to replicate the scale of US or Chinese investment in frontier model training. The government's stated ambition is for the UK to be "a keystone in the global AI architecture — an indispensable partner" rather than a passive consumer of AI developed elsewhere.

=== Economic extraction and digital sovereignty ===
Economists such as Mariana Mazzucato argue that the UK's reliance on US-dominated AI infrastructure risks creating a form of "digital colonialism" or "digital feudalism", where economic value is systematically extracted from the UK and repatriated to the United States.

==== Algorithmic rents and market concentration ====
Economists such as Mariana Mazzucato argue that the current trajectory of AI development is driven by "algorithmic rents", where dominant tech platforms use their control over compute infrastructure and foundation models to extract wealth from users and smaller businesses, rather than creating genuine public value. This dynamic is exacerbated by the immense capital requirements of AI scaling, which naturally concentrates market power among a few US "hyperscalers" (Amazon, Microsoft, and Google).

The Institute for Public Policy Research (IPPR) has warned that the UK's competition framework is struggling to prevent this rising market concentration, which threatens to stifle domestic startups and exacerbate the UK's chronic low investment and stagnant productivity. Furthermore, the Liberal Democrats have argued that the UK's "total dependency on foreign-owned AI and cloud infrastructure" reduces the UK to a "digital colony of Silicon Valley", ceding both economic value and strategic autonomy.

==== Tax base erosion and the Digital Services Tax ====
The repatriation of AI-generated profits to the US poses a direct threat to the UK tax base. The Fair Tax Foundation's 2025 report on the "Silicon Six" (Alphabet, Amazon, Apple, Meta, Microsoft, and Netflix) found that over the past decade, these companies generated $11 trillion in revenue but paid an effective global corporate tax rate of just 18.8% (falling to 16.1% if one-off repatriation payments are excluded). The report highlighted that aggressive profit-shifting to low-tax jurisdictions means overseas revenue is subject to much lower tax rates than US-booked domestic revenue.

To counter this, the UK introduced a Digital Services Tax (DST), a 2% levy on the revenues of search engines, social media services, and online marketplaces. Because it taxes turnover rather than easily shifted profits, the DST is relatively effective, raising £944 million in 2025 alone and projected to raise up to £5.2 billion over the current Parliament.

However, the DST has become a major geopolitical flashpoint. US President Donald Trump has repeatedly threatened to impose punitive tariffs on UK exports unless the tax is scrapped, describing such levies as "overseas extortion". Think tanks such as Chatham House and the Royal United Services Institute (RUSI) have warned that if the UK government trades away the DST to secure US tech investment or avoid tariffs, it would surrender crucial regulatory power and signal a profound loss of digital sovereignty over the foundational infrastructure of the modern economy.

== Companies ==
- ARM Holdings
- ElevenLabs
- Google DeepMind
- Gradient Labs
- Isomorphic Labs
- Mind Foundry
- Peak
- Quantexa
- Recraft
- Stability AI
- Synthesia
- Wayve

== See also ==
- Artificial intelligence industry in Canada
- Artificial intelligence industry in India
- Artificial intelligence industry in Italy
- Artificial intelligence industry in Taiwan
- Artificial intelligence industry in the United States
- Parliamentary Under-Secretary of State for AI and Digital Government
- Science and technology in the United Kingdom
