= James Wise =

James Wise may refer to:

- James Wise (civil surgeon) (died 1886), British civil surgeon in Dhaka, British India
- James E. Wise Jr., U.S. Navy officer
- James H. Wise (bishop) (died 1939), bishop of Kansas in the Episcopal Church
- James H. Wise (politician) (1912–1976), American politician
- James W. Wise (1868–1925), U.S. Representative from Georgia
- James Wise (born 1986), British venture capitalist

== See also ==
- Jim Wise (born 1964), American actor
- Jim Wise (composer) (1919–2000), American musical composer and English professor
- Thomas James Wise (1859–1937), British bibliophile
