= Malik R. Dahlan =

- Born: Sayyid Malik bin Rabea Dahlan Al-Jilani Al-Hassani Al-Hashimi Al-Qurashi Al-Makki
- Education: Al-Azhar University; University of Cambridge; Harvard Law School
- Occupations: Lawyer, international mediator, negotiator
- Known for: Rule of law, mediation, energy, political economy, green energy
- Website: www.quraysh.com

Malik R. Dahlan (مالك بن ربيع دحلان; born 18 August 1979) is an international lawyer, mediator and law professor specializing in international law and policy.

== Early life and education ==
He attended Belmont Hill School in Belmont, MA in the USA. Dahlan read civil law and jurisprudence at Al Al-Bayt University in Jordan and then at the University of Jordan in Amman, where he obtained his bachelor's degree in law in 1999. In 2016, the University of Jordan decorated him as its 50th Anniversary Honorary Alumnus. He completed three masters degrees at Harvard University including from Harvard Law School and received a doctorate in law from al-Azhar.

== Legal career and dispute resolution ==
Dahlan practised trade law at White & Case LLP in New York and was the chief lawyer of MBR Legal.

He served as special advisor to Lord Woolf, former Chief Justice of England and Wales, as well as Sir William Blair, in the establishment of the first independent English Common Law Judiciary in the Middle East from 2007-2010. Dahlan is the founding director of the Qatar Law Forum, inaugurated in 2009.

He has also served on pioneering initiatives in ADR in several jurisdictions. He led several mediation and dispute resolution projects globally. He currently leads the Scotia Group (SG26), which brought together international mediators and experts to build out a ‘sherpa process’ for climate and energy transition diplomacy. His latest book by Edward Elgar, The Research Handbook on Energy, Law and Ethics was launched following the UNFCCC COP26 Process.

== Policy career ==
Dahlan was engaged at the Brookings Institution in Washington, DC, from 2004-2005 and was the founding Director of the Brookings Doha Center.

He served on the World Economic Forum's Global Agenda Council on the Future of the Middle East. He was a trustee of the Arab British Centre and is an Advisory Board Member of the Beirut Institute. He is also a member of the society of fellows of the Aspen Institute and of Aspen Justice Associates.

== Institution Quraysh for Law & Policy (iQ) ==
Dahlan established Institution Quraysh for Law & Policy (iQ) in Doha in 2005.

== Academic involvement ==
Dahlan is currently the Emeritus Professor of International Law and Public Policy at the Centre for Commercial Law Studies (CCLS), Queen Mary University of London. His specialisms are renewable energy law, geopolitics and ethics, as well as investor-state dispute settlement (ISDS). he was elected as a Fellow to Royal Society of Edinburgh Professor Malik Dahlan joined RAND Europe’s Council of Advisors and the Frederick S. Pardee School of Global Studies Dean’s Advisory Board of Boston University

He is on the editorial board of the academic journal “Defence Strategic Communications” of NATO Strategic Communications Centre of Excellence (NATO StratCom COE)

In 2010, Dahlan was a visiting professor at the National University of Singapore (NUS) where he conducted research on models for regional cooperation in the Middle East. This looked at how the Asia Pacific Economic Cooperation (APEC) could inform attempts to mold a regional system for the Middle East. As an Honorary Fellow at the NUS Middle East Institute and Lee Kuan Yew School of Public Policy.

In 2012, he was invited to deliver a European Union keynote address to the Royal Society of Edinburgh on the failure of Arab regional international organization and introduced his theory on Open Regionalism, on which he has published a chapter in Gulf Politics and Economics in a Changing World.

From September 2014 to September 2015, Dahlan was a fellow at Cambridge University's Lauterpacht Centre for International Law affiliated with Peterhouse. While there, he wrote his book "The Hijaz: In Integration Islamic Statehood and the Origins of Arab Self-Determination".

In 2016, he joined the advisory board of the Institute for Legal and Constitutional Research at St Andrews University in Scotland and is a member of the academic board of HRH Prince Hassan bin Talal of Jordan's West-Asia North Africa Institute (WANA). Dahlan served as the International Chair of the Harvard Law School Association from 2011-2016.

He was a trustee of the British Institute of International and Comparative Law and Coexist House, both in London. He sits on the Advisory Board of the SOAS Centre for Islamic and Middle Eastern Law (CIMEL) Yearbook of Islamic and Middle Eastern Law.

In 2019, Dahlan was appointed Senior Mediation Fellow in Residence at the Negotiation Task Force (NTF) of the Davis Center for Russian and Eurasian Studies at Harvard University.

He published Envisioning Foundations for the Law of the Belt and Road Initiative: Rule of Law and Dispute Resolution Challenges in the Harvard International Law Journal

== Publications ==
The Research Handbook on Energy, Law and Ethics was launched following the UNFCCC COP26 Process

- The Hijaz: The First Islamic State 2018
- The Application of the Objectives of Islamic Law on Public Policy Al-Azhar, Samo Press, Beirut 2017. ISBN 9789933291006
- Manliness. A Translation and Commentary on Hamza Shehata's lecture: Ar-Rujulah Imad Al-Khuluq Al-Fadel (Manliness: The Pillar of Virtuous Ethic) Haus Publishing 2016. ISBN 9780956599612
