= Institution Quraysh for Law & Policy =

Qatar-based think tank

- No. of offices: 3 total
- Major practice areas: Public Policy, Law, Research, Transnational Trade and Investment, Dispute Resolution, Intergenerational Equity, Rule of Law, Peace Mediation and Negotiation, Sovereign Affairs.
- Key people: Prince El Hassan bin Talal, Lord Woolf, Sheikh Ahmed Zaki Yamani, Stanley Hoffmann, Louise Richardson, Carlos Salinas, Mark Ellis.
- Founder: Malik R. Dahlan
- Company type: Law and Policy
- Website: www.Quraysh.com

Institution Quraysh for Law & Policy, also known as iQ, is a transnational law think-tank with offices in London and with a focus on promoting the rule of law globally. The institution's history goes back to the Arab World, in particular the states of the Gulf Cooperation Council. It advised regional, and international corporations operating in the region, in addition to policy work with national governments, sovereign entities, and international non-governmental organisations.

iQ was affiliated with the Washington, D.C.–based law firm Covington & Burling LLP from 2008 to 2014.

== History ==
The institution was established by Malik R. Dahlan in 2006 with the stated goal of providing an integrated and comprehensive transnational consulting capacity by coupling the provision of legal advice and services with policy expertise. Dahlan himself is a multi-jurisdictional qualified attorney, with qualifications from Jordan, and the United States of America. He also undertook a Doctorate in Public Policy in Egypt. After working in both the corporate and policy sectors in the Gulf, and the US, including the Brookings Institution, Dahlan founded iQ in Doha, Qatar.

The institution expanded rapidly, opening further offices in Jeddah, Saudi Arabia, and London, United Kingdom, and establishing an Advisory Council of renowned figures from law, policy matters, and academia. These include Lord Woolf, formerly Lord Chief Justice of England and Wales, and Ahmed Zaki Yamani, formerly Saudi Arabian Minister for Petroleum and Mineral Resources, and a key figure within the Organization of Petroleum Exporting Countries (OPEC). iQ also established a body of International Experts and fellows who collaborate on specific legal and policy matters.

== iPlatform ==
In 2013 iQ launched its iPlatform initiative at University College London which, sought to engage specifically with students and young thinkers, and leading academics, lawyers, policy experts, governments and industry, to explore macro public policy challenges through the lens of law, ethics, and intergenerational equity.

The Innovation Platform for Global Change followed a trajectory of expanding public policy toolkits to confront the demographic and economic global realities. The iPlatform stated mission tates "That it is only by engaging with generational conflict as policy makers that we can hope to grapple with some of the biggest problems that global societies face in the decade ahead."

In 2020 iQ relaunched iPlatform with a solitary focus on promoting ‘Global Commitments to the Rule of Law’ which received widespread international coverage including in the Financial Times on Sina the prominent Chinese micro-blogging site and on Al Bawaba one of the largest independent news platforms in the Middle East.

== Policy and Collaboration ==
iQ works with a network of 'friend' universities and institutions on projects and research. This goes as farback as May 2009, when iQ organised the inaugural Qatar Law Forum of Global Leaders in Law in Doha, in concert with the Qatari Ministry of Foreign Affairs. Lord Woolf, and Sir William Blair, a prominent High Court Judge in England and Wales, and expert on Islamic finance, served as the Law Forum's Co-Conveners.

iQ was also involved in the creation of the Civil and Commercial Court, and Regulatory Tribunal of the Qatar Financial Centre, twin judicial bodies which represent the first institutional synthesis of shari'ah, common law, and civil law.

Plans for establishing further offices in Saudi Arabia were announced by iQ in February 2011.

== International Dispute Registry ==
International Dispute Regustry (IDR) in London. Following the publication of a conceptional journal article on "Regulation of Disputes" IDR was co-established in London with a focus on mediation and dispute resolution and specifically managing the life cycles of contractual arrangements, investment projects and disputes arising therefrom. The effort was led by Wolf von Kumberg, former European legal counsel for Northrop Grumman, a former president of the Chartered Institute of Arbitrators, chairman of the International Mediation Institute, director of American Arbitration Association and the Centre for Effective Dispute Resolution. IDR has developed international legal mediation strategies and shuttle diplomacy efforts in collaboration with Harvard University.

== See also ==
- Covington & Burling
- Malik R. Dahlan
- Qatar Law Forum of Global Leaders in Law
