= Sovereign AI Fund =

UK government venture capital fund for artificial intelligence

- Type: Government-backed venture fund
- Industry: Artificial intelligence; venture capital
- Founded: April 16, 2026; 6 months ago
- Key people: Suzanne Ashman (managing partner); James Wise (chair)
- Services: Equity investment; access to computing resources; research and development support
- Owner: Government of the United Kingdom
- Parent: British Technology Investments
- Website: www.sovereignai.gov.uk

The Sovereign AI Fund is a £500 million venture capital fund established by the Government of the United Kingdom in April 2026. The fund is designed to invest directly in early-stage and growth-stage British artificial intelligence (AI) companies, providing them with capital, access to computing power, and strategic support. The initiative aims to build "homegrown" AI capabilities, reduce reliance on foreign technology providers, and ensure the UK remains competitive in the global AI sector.

== Background and strategy ==
The creation of the Sovereign AI Fund is part of a broader UK government strategy to position the country as an "AI maker, not an AI taker," a phrase used by Prime Minister Keir Starmer and outlined in the government's January 2025 AI Opportunities Action Plan.

The fund operates similarly to a venture capital firm but with state backing, aiming to cut through bureaucracy and move quickly to support high-potential startups. It offers typical equity investments ranging from £1 million to £10 million. In addition to capital, the fund provides startups with access to the UK's AI Research Resource (AIRR) supercomputer network, offering up to 1 million GPU hours to help companies train advanced models. It also assists with fast-tracked visas for global talent and navigating government procurement and regulation.

Alongside the main equity fund, Sovereign AI launched a £282 million Strategic Assets Grants Programme to fund the creation of shared strategic AI assets, as "critical inputs ... for the wider AI ecosystem", such as high-value datasets and automated laboratory infrastructure.

In September 2026, the Unit announced the launch of it's R&D procurement scheme, which aims to make Government a better customer for UK-based companies building AI for better public services. In his first budget, the Chancellor, John Healey, announced an additional £140M for the fund, focussed on expanding this procurement effort and investing into UK-based robotics.

== Leadership ==
The Sovereign AI Unit's inaugural chair is James Wise, a partner at Balderton Capital. The Head of Ventures is Joséphine Kant.

In May 2026, Suzanne Ashman, a former General Partner at LocalGlobe and Latitude, was appointed as Managing Partner of the fund's investment committee. Ashman is married to Euan Blair, the son of former UK Prime Minister Tony Blair.

== Portfolio ==
As of July 2026, Sovereign AI has backed four startups through direct equity investments.

=== Equity investments ===
- Callosum: An AI infrastructure startup building a new class of heterogeneous computing. This was the fund's first equity investment.
- Ineffable Intelligence: Founded by David Silver, former Head of Reinforcement Learning at Google DeepMind. The company is developing self-learning AI systems that generate new knowledge rather than imitating human data. Sovereign AI co-invested with the British Business Bank.
- Isomorphic Labs: A drug discovery company founded by Nobel laureate Demis Hassabis, using frontier AI to design and develop new medicines. The investment was announced in May 2026 as part of a larger fundraise.
- Cusp AI: A Cambridge-based AI model company focussed on developing new materials for use cases like more powerful semi-conductors and efficient batteries.

== Reception and criticism ==
The launch of the fund was welcomed by some in the tech industry as a necessary step to support domestic innovation. However, venture capitalists have argued that the £500 million fund is a "drop in the ocean" compared to the billions invested globally, and that deeper structural issues remain significant barriers to the UK's AI ambitions, including high industrial electricity prices, grid connection delays, and talent shortages.

Representatives from UK creative industries have expressed alarm that the fund may be backing companies that train AI models on copyrighted works without permission, urging the government to ensure funded companies respect copyright and transparency standards.

The fund was created after a review of AI opportunities for the new British Labour Government made by Matt Clifford. Private Eye noted that beneficiaries of Sovereign AI include Callosum, which also received funding from Clifford's venture capital fund Entrepreneurs First, although he is no longer active with the fund.
