= James Wise (businessman) =

British venture capitalist and author

James Wise (born 1986) is a British venture capitalist and author from Manchester, England. He is a general partner at Balderton Capital and the inaugural chair of the United Kingdom's Sovereign AI Unit, a £500 million government-backed venture fund investing in British artificial intelligence companies. In 2026 Computer Weekly ranked him second in its annual UKtech50 list of the most influential people in UK technology, having previously been named by Business Insider among the 100 most influential people in British technology in 2019.

Wise joined Balderton Capital in 2013 and became a general partner in 2016, at the time he was the youngest partner of a venture fund in Europe. The fund is known for its early investments in Revolut, Darktrace, Quantum Systems and Wayve. In November 2025 the Secretary of State for Science, Innovation and Technology, Liz Kendall, announced his appointment as inaugural chair of the Sovereign AI Unit, which launched in April 2026 and makes equity investments in UK-based AI companies. In September 2026, Wise announced the launch of the Sovereign AI Unit's £100M procurement scheme, stating in a Bloomberg interview that the Unit was focussed on procuring services from British AI companies.

Wise's first book, Start-Up Century: Why We're All Becoming Entrepreneurs — and How to Make It Work for Everyone, was published by Bloomsbury Business in November 2023. It argues that entrepreneurship and self-employment are long-run secular trends and sets out policy proposals to support small businesses and individual founders. The book carried endorsements from the inventor James Dyson and Mustafa Suleyman, chief executive of Microsoft AI.
