= Multiverse (company) =

British educational technology company

Multiverse Group Limited
- Type: Private
- Industry: Artificial intelligence, educational technology
- Founded: 2016
- Headquarters: London, United Kingdom
- Key people: Euan Blair
- Number of employees: 813 (January 2026)
- Website: https://www.multiverse.io/

Multiverse is a British educational technology company founded in 2016 by Euan Blair and Sophie Adelman. Based in London, United Kingdom, the company provides apprenticeship-based training and upskilling for early-career and experienced employees, primarily in technology and artificial intelligence roles. Multiverse works with employers to assess skills gaps within their workforce and delivers training programmes aligned with organisational needs.

== History ==
Multiverse was founded in 2016 by friends Euan Blair and Sophie Adelman to provide a platform for companies to recruit school leavers through apprenticeships. It was initially launched under the name WhiteHat, which was named after the hackers employed by companies to test their IT security. The company rebranded to Multiverse in 2021.

In 2018, the company announced it had raised £3 million ($4 million) of seed investment from Lightspeed Venture Partners.

In 2021, Adelman stepped back from the company but retained a seat on its board and a shareholding. In September of that year, Multiverse raised £97 million ($130 million) from multiple investors including D1 Capital Partners and BOND.

In June 2022, Multiverse raised £163 million ($220 million) of investment which valued the company at £1.2 billion ($1.7 billion). The company received investment from investors including Lightspeed Venture Partners, General Catalyst, StepStone Group and Founders Circle Capital. The fundraise gave the company 'unicorn’ status.

In 2022, the company reported a loss of £10.9 million to 31 March 2021 on revenues of £10.1 million. In September 2022, the company was granted a license to award degrees with all learning taught through apprenticeships rather than through university.

In 2023, it was reported that Multiverse received an investment by the Walton family.

In April 2024, Multiverse acquired SearchLight, a US recruitment software company. In the announcement, Blair said the acquisition will 'combine Multiverse's scale with Searchlight’s technology'.

In March 2025, the company reported revenues of £58.4 million to March 2024, and losses of £60.6 million.

In January 2026, Multiverse recorded a loss of £63.3 million on revenues of £79.6 million in the year to March 2025.

In early 2026, Multiverse closed a $70 million funding round, increasing their valuation to $2.1 billion, driven by increased demand for AI training. The company achieved their first cash flow positive quarter in January to March 2026.

== Operations ==
As of January 2026, the company employed 813 people. According to the company, it has worked with more than 1,500 companies and placed more than 22,000 people into apprenticeships.

=== Board Members ===
In June 2022, Multiverse appointed Youngme Moon as a non-executive director. In November 2024, the company appointed Martha Lane Fox as a non-executive director.

=== Partnerships ===
Multiverse is partnered with Microsoft and Databricks.

The company provides apprenticeship programmes to the AA, Capita, Addison Lee, Babcok, and Age UK. In 2026, the UK Government announced that they would be partnering with Multiverse as part of its move towards AI upskilling.
