= Qatar Law Forum of Global Leaders in Law =

- Type: Non-profit organization
- Headquarters: Doha, Qatar, and London, United Kingdom
- Region served: Worldwide
- Director: Malik R. Dahlan
- Website: www.QatarLawForum.com

The Qatar Law Forum of Global Leaders in Law is a non-profit institution established under the patronage of the Government of Qatar with the purpose of bringing together prominent members of the global legal community, in addition to senior figures in the fields of economics, and politics. The inaugural Law Forum was held in Doha from 29–31 May 2009.

== History ==
In 2008, the Qatari Ministry of Foreign Affairs announced plans to hold an international conference of what it termed "Global Leaders in Law", defined as prominent jurists, academics, and legal practitioners from legal jurisdictions representing every continent, and region in the world. The stated purpose of the conference was for delegates to discuss pressing matters of international legal, economic, and political concern, with a particular focus on addressing such issues in the context of the Arab and Muslim worlds.

These initial plans were later expanded upon to encompass a wider mandate of fostering inter-jurisdictional legal dialogue and supporting a "Global Commitment to the Rule of Law". The spectrum of delegates was widened to include economists, bankers, international policy experts, and members of regional and international non-governmental organisations (NGOs). Lord Woolf, the former Lord Chief Justice of England and Wales, and Sir William Blair, a prominent High Court Judge in England and Wales, and expert on Islamic finance, were appointed as the Law Forum's Co-Conveners.

The organising process for the Law Forum was overseen by Institution Quraysh for Law & Policy (iQ), a Qatar-based transnational law firm and think-tank, and the Qatari Ministry of Foreign Affairs' Permanent Committee for Organizing Conferences. iQ's Principal and Chief Lawyer, Malik R. Dahlan, was appointed as the Law Forum's Director.

== Inaugural Law Forum ==
The inaugural assembly of the Law Forum took place in the Qatari capital, Doha, from 29–31 May 2009, and was attended by more than 500 delegates from 65 different legal jurisdictions. The event was primarily made up of panel sessions covering a range of legal, economic, and political matters:

- The implications of globalisation on justice
- The role of international judicial bodies
- Shari’ah and legal reform in the Arab World
- The Rule of Law
- Islamic finance
- Sports law
- Local and international legal practice
- Corporate centres and financial markets
- Global governance
- Regulatory law and the 2008 financial crisis
- Law and women
- The new Qatar international judiciary
- New trends in legal education development
- International dispute resolution, and the place of law and economics

=== Participants ===
In addition to the attendance of senior members of the Qatari political and legal establishment, including the Prime Minister and Minister of Foreign Affairs of Qatar, Sheikh Hamad bin Jassim bin Jaber Al-Thani, and the Qatari Attorney General, Dr. Ali bin Fetais Al-Marri, participants in the inaugural Law Forum included serving chief justices from 12 different legal jurisdictions, the President of the U.K. Supreme Court, Lord Phillips of Worth Matravers, the President of the International Court of Justice, Hisashi Owada, the President of the European Court of Human Rights, Jean-Paul Costa, the Chief Prosecutor of the International Criminal Court, Luis Moreno-Ocampo, and senior members of the World Bank, and the International Monetary Fund.

== Future plans ==
Qatar's Assistant Foreign Minister for Follow-Up Affairs, Mohammed Al-Rumaihi, and the Law Forum's Director, Malik R. Dahlan, have stated that the Qatar Law Forum of Global Leaders in Law intends to hold its second full assembly in Doha in late 2011 or early 2012.
