= Victor Noel-Paton, Baron Ferrier =

British soldier and businessman (1900–1992)

Major The Right Honourable The Lord Ferrier ED TD DL
- Born: 29 January 1900; Edinburgh, Scotland
- Died: 4 June 1992 (aged 92)
- Spouse: Joane Mary Wiles (m. 1932; died 1984)
- Children: 3

Victor Ferrier Noel-Paton, Baron Ferrier ED TD DL (29 January 1900 – 4 June 1992) was a British soldier and commercial businessman. With interests in banking and insurance he was in the first group of life peers elevated.

== Life ==
Victor Ferrier Noel-Paton was born in Edinburgh in 1900, son of Joane Mary and Frederick Waller Ferrier Noel-Paton, a senior official of the Government of India, sometime Director-General of Commercial Intelligence. The extended family lived in a large Georgian house owned by his grandfather, Joseph Noel Paton, at 33 George Square.

After education at Cargilfield and the Edinburgh Academy, and service in the Royal Engineers in 1918–19, he went to India and from 1920 to 1951 built a distinguished career in commerce and politics in Bombay. During this time he rose to the management and chairmanship of various companies, became President of the Bombay Chamber of Commerce, a member of the Bombay Legislative Council, and a trustee of the Port of Bombay.

He also served for most of this period in the Indian Auxiliary Force, and held the rank of Major. He was an Honorary Aide-de-camp to the Governor of Bombay. On 7 March 1932, in Bombay, he married Joane Mary, daughter of Sir Gilbert Wiles, K.C.I.E., C.S.I.; they had a son and three daughters.

Noel-Paton was first commissioned on to the Auxiliary Force India 8 April 1919 and served as an officer of the Bombay Light Horse. He was commissioned on to the Army in India Reserve of Officer on 10 February 1928. He served as captain in the Army in India Reserve of Officer attached to the 19th King George V's Own Lancers in the Indian Army from 1928 to 1934. He received the Efficiency Decoration (ED) and was a Deputy Lieutenant. When he returned to Edinburgh in 1951 he was appointed chairman of Edinburgh Pharmaceutical Industries, as well as on the boards of two insurance companies.

On 26 September 1958, he was made a life peer as Baron Ferrier, of Culter in the County of Lanark, in the first fourteen creations under the Life Peerage Act 1958. He was introduced as a Conservative peer on 22 October 1958. On 3 December he made his maiden speech in which he identified with old age pensions as being an intractable problem. Generally supportive of the NHS in debate, he was however a Conservative in policy matters including the poll tax.

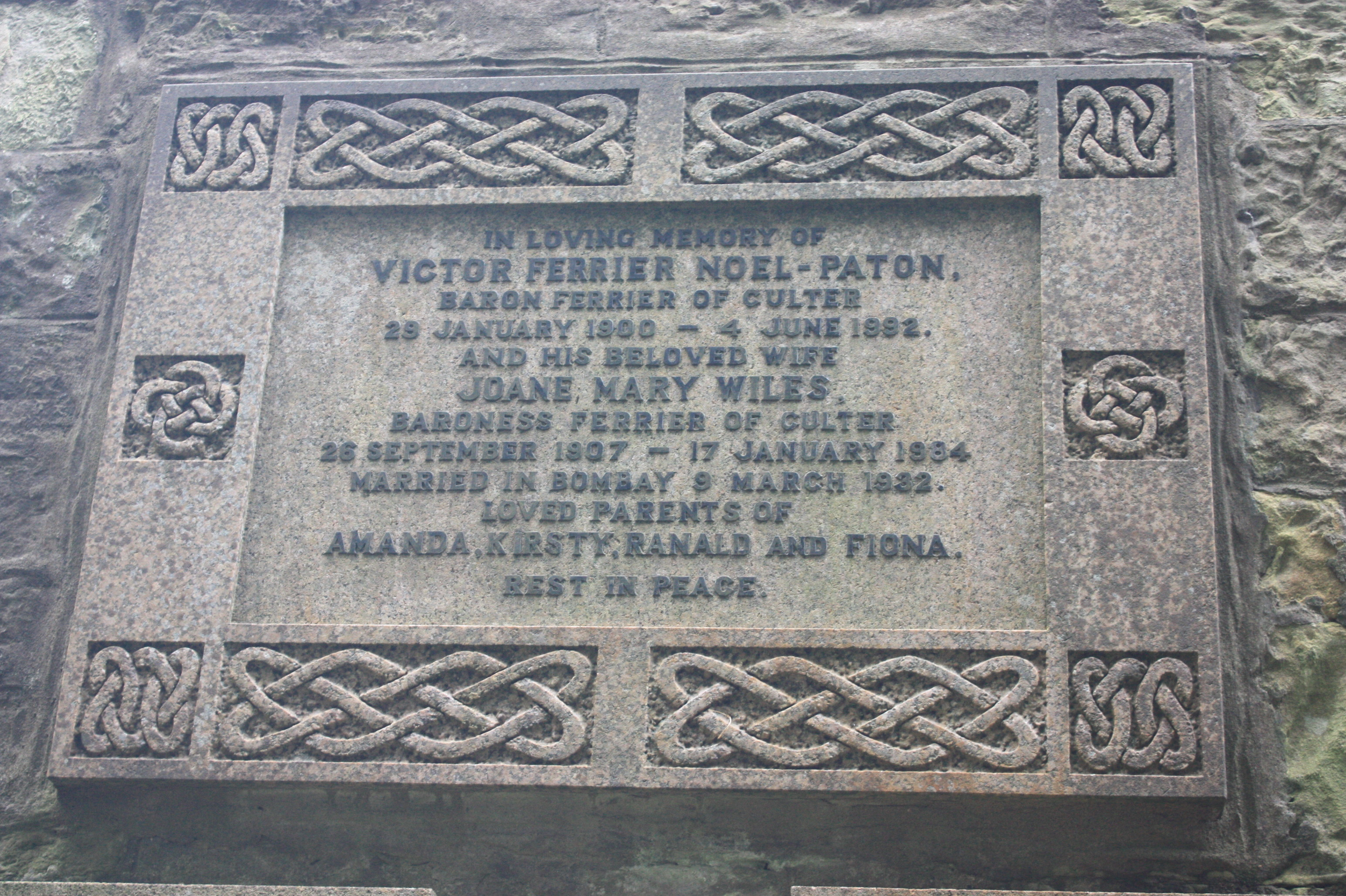
The grave of Victor Ferrier Noel-Paton, Dean Cemetery in Edinburgh

Like many Conservatives in the late post-war era he was critical of a perceived doctrinaire left-wing bias in the BBC. So he opposed lowering the voting age in 1968 and took a moral stance against pornography on the 'top shelf' in shops. Patriarchal and caring, he took an interest in the social security system and damage that could be done to young people. Lord Ferrier was an expert committee-man appearing on a number of committees, including joint house leadership – notably during the premiership of Edward Heath, 1970–3.

He is buried on the southern terrace at Dean Cemetery in Edinburgh with his wife Joane. The plot is adjacent to his ancestor Joseph Noel Paton.

== Family ==
In 1932, whilst in Bombay he married Joane Mary Wiles (1907–1984). They had four children: Amanda, Kirsty, Frederick and Fiona.

== Arms ==
Coat of arms of Victor Noel-Paton, Baron Ferrier
Crest A dexter hand paleways Proper having a passion cross Gules on the palm issuant from a crescent Or all in front of two doves' wings expanded and erected Proper. Escutcheon Azure a wolf's head erased Argent armed and langued Gules between two crescents in chief and a fleur-de-lys in base Or, a bordure Argent charged with eight horseshoes Sable. Motto Do Right And Fear Nocht
