= Copyright and artificial intelligence in the United Kingdom =

The interaction of artificial intelligence (AI) and copyright law has become one of the most contentious tech policy debates in the United Kingdom, centering on whether AI developers should be permitted to train their models on copyrighted material without explicit consent or remuneration. This debate has exposed a deep fracture between the creative industries, which seek to protect their intellectual property from unauthorised commercial exploitation, and tech companies. The academic and library sectors are also impacted, and argue that overly restrictive copyright laws hinder scientific research and the UK's sovereign AI capabilities.

In 2024, the UK government proposed a broad text and data mining (TDM) exception to copyright that would have allowed AI companies to use publicly available copyrighted material for training, offering creators only an "opt-out" mechanism, similar to the exception introduced in Europe. This proposal faced intense opposition from across the creative sector. Trade unions representing writers, musicians, performers, and journalists argued that such an exception would effectively expropriate their members' work for the commercial benefit of tech giants. A report from the House of Lords Communications and Digital Committee, warned that generative AI posed a "clear and present danger" to the £124 billion creative economy. The government abandoned the opt-out model in March 2026, opting instead to build a stronger evidence base before pursuing any copyright reform.

Conversely, the academic and library sectors have raised significant concerns that the UK's current TDM exception, which is strictly limited to non-commercial research, is too narrow. Universities and research libraries occupy a dual role as both creators of vast datasets and beneficiaries of TDM exceptions. They argue that the current legal framework restricts their ability to computationally analyse the very research they produce, thereby hobbling the UK's "AI for Science" strategy. Advocacy groups have highlighted a "triple payment" problem, wherein publicly funded research is handed over to publishers, who then charge universities substantial subscription fees and demand additional payments for specific TDM licences.

This tension is further complicated by the commercial practices of major academic publishers. While publishers often restrict universities from using subscribed databases for AI training, they have simultaneously entered into lucrative, multi-million-dollar licensing agreements to sell access to this academic content to commercial AI developers. Furthermore, academics have accused publishers of actively steering authors away from permissive open-access licences towards more restrictive variants. By doing so, publishers retain the exclusive commercial rights necessary to strike these AI training deals, often without consulting the original authors or offering them any additional remuneration. This dynamic has not only reopened debates within the Open Access movement but has also created complex legal scenarios where publishers, rather than authors, control the terms of copyright litigation against major tech companies.

== Training on copyrighted material ==
The question of whether AI developers should be permitted to train their models on copyrighted material without payment or consent has been one of the most contentious policy debates in the UK AI landscape. In 2024, the then-Conservative government proposed a broad text and data mining (TDM) exception that would have allowed AI companies to use any publicly available copyrighted material for training purposes, with creators able only to "opt out" of having their work used. This proposal provoked intense opposition from writers, musicians, visual artists, publishers, and broadcasters, who argued it would effectively expropriate their intellectual property for the commercial benefit of AI companies.

The debate over text and data mining exceptions extends significantly beyond generative AI and the creative industries, implicating a wide range of scientific, industrial, and academic research applications. TDM is a foundational process for analysing large datasets to identify patterns, trends, and correlations, which is heavily utilised in fields such as medical research, climate modelling, and financial services.

In the scientific and academic sectors, researchers rely on TDM to process vast amounts of published literature. For example, in biomedical research, TDM is used to accelerate drug discovery, identify new uses for existing medicines, and extract insights from clinical notes and genomic datasets. However, the application of traditional copyright frameworks to scientific literature has been criticised by academics. Researchers argue that scientific writing is intended to convey factual, verifiable information rather than creative originality, and that copyright restrictions on TDM hinder reproducibility, validation, and the advancement of science. The current UK copyright exception for TDM (Section 29A of the Copyright, Designs and Patents Act 1988) is limited strictly to non-commercial research, which creates barriers for public-private research partnerships and commercial scientific development.

Beyond academia, non-generative AI and TDM are critical to various industrial and commercial operations. In the financial services sector, TDM is employed to monitor transactions, detect fraud, and analyse market feeds. Other non-generative applications include search engine indexing, plagiarism detection software, and media monitoring. A 2026 report by Public First estimated that 19% of UK businesses use specialised TDM tools, and that a restrictive copyright regime requiring licenses for all copyrighted content could cost the UK economy £220 billion in lost AI-driven GDP growth by 2035 compared to a broad commercial TDM exemption. Industry advocates argue that the lack of a commercial TDM exception in the UK creates legal uncertainty that stifles innovation across these broader, non-generative applications of data analysis.

=== Tech and AI industry positions ===
The technology and artificial intelligence industries lobbied for a broad text and data mining (TDM) exception to UK copyright law, arguing that such an exception is essential for the UK to remain globally competitive in AI development. Industry bodies such as techUK have argued that without a TDM exception, the UK risks becoming an "AI taker rather than an AI maker," as developers will relocate training operations to jurisdictions with more permissive copyright regimes, such as the United States, Japan, Singapore, and the European Union.

During the UK government's 2024–2025 consultation on copyright and AI, major AI developers and trade associations strongly supported "Option 2" (a broad TDM exception) or "Option 3" (a TDM exception with an opt-out mechanism). OpenAI stated in its consultation response that a broad TDM exception is "necessary to drive AI innovation and investment in the UK," arguing that developers should be permitted to train models on lawfully accessed copies without further distribution. The Computer and Communications Industry Association (CCIA) similarly argued that restricting TDM to non-commercial development would undermine the government's ambitions for the UK tech sector and frustrate partnerships between commercial entities and research institutions.

Tech industry advocates have also highlighted the economic implications of copyright policy. According to analysis by the think tank UK Day One, adopting an overly restrictive licensing-only approach could result in the UK economy losing up to £182 billion over 20 years, whereas a broad TDM exception could generate a positive impact of £131.61 billion over the same period. Following the government's March 2026 decision to drop plans for a TDM exception in favour of a market-led licensing approach, techUK's Deputy CEO Antony Walker criticised the move, stating that "copyright material cannot be used for AI development and training without permission" under the current framework, which he argued would push AI model training to the US.

=== Creative sector and political opposition to text and data mining ===
In March 2026, the House of Lords Communications and Digital Committee published a report, AI, Copyright and the Creative Industries, which concluded that the creative industries face "a clear and present danger from generative AI" and that it would be "a very poor bet" for the government to weaken copyright protections to attract AI investment. The Committee noted that the creative industries contributed £124 billion to the UK economy in 2023 and employed 2.4 million people, compared to the AI sector's £12 billion GVA and 86,000 employees in 2024. The Committee called on the government to develop a "licensing-first" regime underpinned by mandatory transparency requirements, and to rule out any new commercial TDM exception with an opt-out model.

Trade unions representing the creative industries have been particularly vocal regarding the unauthorised use of members' work to train generative AI models. In December 2025, members of Equity, the performing arts and entertainment trade union, voted by 99.6% to refuse to be digitally scanned on set unless adequate AI protections were secured. The union argued that performers were increasingly concerned about the use of their voice and likeness without explicit consent, transparency, or fair remuneration. Equity has campaigned for the creation of specific "personality rights" and "digital replica rights" in UK law.

The Writers' Guild of Great Britain (WGGB) and the Musicians' Union (MU) have similarly campaigned against the government's initial proposals to introduce a broad copyright exception for text and data mining by AI companies. Following sustained pressure from these unions and the wider Creators' Rights Alliance, the UK government reversed its stance in March 2026, abandoning the proposed "opt-out" model that would have allowed AI developers to use copyrighted material without permission. The National Union of Journalists (NUJ) has also warned that AI "cannot fill the gap" left by editorial redundancies, stressing that AI must only be used as an assistive tool with human oversight, and that developers must be mandated to reveal their training data sources to allow freelance journalists to seek redress for copyright infringement.

Following pressure from the creative industries and Unions, the government published its own Report on Copyright and Artificial Intelligence in March 2026, acknowledging it had "limited and uncertain evidence on the impact of copyright on the development and deployment of AI in the UK" and that it must "continue to build the evidence base" before reforming copyright law.

=== Universities, libraries, and academic research ===
In contrast to the creative sector, academia and libraries have been concerned about the use of copyright and licensing to restrict access to research. The interplay between artificial intelligence, copyright, and text and data mining (TDM) has become a policy concern for the UK higher education and library sectors. Universities, academic researchers, and research libraries occupy a dual role in the AI ecosystem: they are both beneficiaries of TDM exceptions for scientific research and the creators of vast collections and databases that are crucial for training AI models.

The concern over copyright and TDM exceptions being too narrow and restricting the use of academic material for AI training has brought intense scrutiny to the business models of major academic publishers, such as Elsevier, Taylor & Francis, and Wiley. While these publishers restrict universities from using their subscribed databases for AI training without explicit permission, they have simultaneously entered into lucrative licensing agreements to sell access to this same academic content to commercial AI developers. For example, in 2024, Taylor & Francis expected to generate $75 million from AI licensing deals, while Wiley anticipated $44 million.

This dynamic has led to what critics term the "triple payment" (or sometimes "quadruple payment") problem in academic research. First, the research itself is funded by the public sector or taxpayers. Second, academic authors and peer reviewers provide their labour to publishers for free, often transferring their copyright in the process. Third, universities must pay substantial subscription fees to access the published research. Finally, under a restrictive licensing regime, universities are asked to pay a fourth time for a specific TDM or AI-training licence to computationally analyse the very research they funded and produced.

Advocacy groups like Knowledge Rights 21 have highlighted how publishers use contract law to override statutory rights. For instance, some publisher contracts explicitly prohibit the creation of derivative products that might compete with the publisher, specifically banning the use of TDM outputs in connection with generative AI systems. Furthermore, some contracts mandate the destruction of locally stored data once a specific TDM project concludes, a requirement that researchers argue is "anti-science and anti-safety" because it prevents the long-term retention of data necessary to verify AI outputs and audit models for bias or errors. Critics argue that by forcing universities to pay for TDM licences while simultaneously selling academic data to tech giants, legacy publishers are effectively privatising the public good of knowledge and hindering the UK's sovereign AI research capacity. A 2023 study commissioned by KR21 analysed 100 licensing contracts between scientific publishers and research institutions, finding that more than half sought to prohibit text and data mining, either explicitly or implicitly (such as by banning the use of automated crawlers).

In response, Jisc (the UK digital agency for tertiary education) issued formal guidance in June 2024 advising universities to resist restrictive AI clauses in publisher licences. Jisc's own model licence deliberately omits restrictions on using licensed content for machine learning or AI purposes. Jisc advised its members to oppose clauses that prohibit the use of AI for legitimate research or educational purposes, arguing that such restrictions are "both legally complex and challenging to enforce" and may conflict with the statutory rights granted under Section 29A of the CDPA.

Under UK law, Section 29A of the Copyright, Designs and Patents Act 1988 (CDPA) provides an exception for text and data mining, but it is strictly limited to non-commercial research. The UK government had previously proposed introducing a broader commercial TDM exception with an opt-out mechanism (similar to Article 4 of the EU Directive on Copyright in the Digital Single Market), but as noted above, following intense opposition from the creative industries, the government formally abandoned this proposal in its March 2026 Report on Copyright and Artificial Intelligence, opting to maintain the status quo.

Academic and library advocacy groups have criticised the narrowness of the UK's TDM exception. Knowledge Rights 21 (KR21), a coalition supported by the International Federation of Library Associations and Institutions (IFLA), has argued that without exemptions for both commercial and academic data mining, the UK government's "AI for Science" strategy will be hobbled. The CREATe Centre at the University of Glasgow has similarly argued that the current exception "does not cover the whole lifecycle of AI models and systems," creating legal uncertainties at all stages of AI research and development. CREATe proposed a policy focus on protecting the "research and development space before market entry," rather than relying on the increasingly blurred distinction between commercial and non-commercial research.

In April 2025, the International Federation of Library Associations and Institutions (IFLA) issued a formal statement on copyright and AI. IFLA warned that the intense debate between the copyright industry and major AI companies "too often does not leave space to focus on the priorities of libraries, enabling access to information, education, research, and cultural participation." IFLA called for advocacy in favour of limitations and exceptions that enable text-and-data mining of legitimately acquired content, arguing that access to the widest possible datasets is a necessary defence against bias and error in AI systems. In the UK, the Society of College, National and University Libraries (SCONUL) and the Universities and Colleges Information Systems Association (UCISA) submitted a joint response to the government's 2025 AI copyright consultation to represent these sector-wide concerns.

=== Academic licensing, licence steering and AI commercialisation ===
The use of academic research to train Large Language Models (LLMs) has also reopened debates within the Open Access (OA) movement, with some voices wishing to restrict the use of their work for the training of AI models. The standard licence for open-access scholarly material is the Creative Commons Attribution License (CC BY), which permits downstream reuse, including commercial reuse, provided attribution is given. However, as LLM developers have scraped open-access repositories to train their models, some academics have expressed disquiet, questioning whether open licences can or should be used to prohibit machine learning reuse. Legal scholars note that neither CC BY-NC (Non-Commercial) nor CC BY-ND (No Derivatives) licences effectively prevent AI training, as such training is often legally classified as a "transformative" fair use in jurisdictions like the United States, overriding the specific terms of the Creative Commons licence.

Academics have accused major publishers of actively steering authors away from permissive Creative Commons Attribution (CC BY) licence towards more restrictive variants, such as CC BY-NC (Non-Commercial) or CC BY-NC-ND (Non-Commercial, No Derivatives), in order to retain exclusive commercial rights for AI training deals.

While CC BY allows anyone to reuse and adapt the work for any purpose (including commercial AI training) provided the author is credited, the NC and ND restrictions prevent third parties from doing so. However, publishers such as Elsevier and Springer Nature require authors selecting these restrictive licences to grant the publisher the exclusive right to commercialise the work. Elsevier's copyright policy explicitly states: "Authors publishing under the CC BY-NC-ND or CC BY-NC licenses agree not to license any third party to reuse their articles or any part of their articles for commercial purposes. Elsevier has the exclusive right to license third parties to do this."

Critics argue that publishers use "soft mandates" and system design to nudge authors towards these restrictive licences. For example, the American Chemical Society (ACS) has offered a $500 discount on Article Processing Charges (APCs) to authors who select the most restrictive CC BY-NC-ND licence. Furthermore, Elsevier's author-facing forms have been criticised for describing the CC BY option as a licence that permits adaptation "even commercially", a phrasing that open access advocates argue is designed to make the permissive licence sound risky to authors unfamiliar with copyright nuances.

The commercial logic behind retaining these exclusive rights became apparent in 2024, when several major academic publishers announced lucrative AI training partnerships with tech companies. Informa, the parent company of Taylor & Francis, signed a $10 million AI data deal with Microsoft, while John Wiley & Sons confirmed it expected to earn $44 million from AI rights deals. In both cases, academic authors reported that they were not consulted, were not given the opportunity to opt out, and received no additional remuneration for the use of their research.

This dynamic has also complicated copyright litigation. In May 2026, Elsevier, alongside several trade publishers, filed a class-action lawsuit in the US against Meta alleging that its Llama AI models were trained on pirated academic papers. The Authors Alliance noted the irony of the situation: because authors who selected CC BY-NC or CC BY-NC-ND licences had granted exclusive commercial rights to Elsevier, the publisher, rather than the authors, became the class representative in the lawsuit, leaving authors with no direct say in any potential settlement that might ultimately license their work to Meta.

== See also ==
- Copyright, Designs and Patents Act 1988

== Bibliography ==
- Fiil-Flynn, Sean M.; et al. (2 December 2022). "Legal reform to enhance global text and data mining research". Science. 378 (6623): 951–953. Bibcode:2022Sci...378..951F. doi:10.1126/science.add6124. hdl:10197/29031. PMID 36454827.
- Huang, Yuanyuan; Liu, Hui (10 April 2026). "Limitations of current copyright frameworks for large language models trained on scientific literature". Frontiers in Artificial Intelligence. 9 1781692. doi:10.3389/frai.2026.1781692. PMC 13106536. PMID 42038543.
- Waibel, Günter; Hansen, Dave (7 January 2025). "AI and the Struggle for Control Over Research". Inside Higher Ed.
- Willemyns, Julia; Serôdio, Pedro (5 August 2025). "Who actually benefits from an AI licensing regime?: not the creators nor the UK". British Progress.
- Barraclough, Leo (18 December 2025). "British Performers Back Industrial Action Over AI After Landslide Vote". Variety.
- Battersby, Matilda (19 July 2024). "Academic authors 'shocked' after Taylor & Francis sells access to their research to Microsoft AI". The Bookseller.
- BBC News (18 March 2026). "Government backtracks on AI and copyright after outcry". BBC News.
- Computer & Communications Industry Association (27 February 2025). "CCIA response to Copyright and AI: Consultation" (PDF). Computer & Communications Industry Association.
- CREATe (30 March 2026). "Academic research and Government policy on AI and copyright". CREATe.
- Creative Rights in AI Coalition (20 December 2024). "AI and copyright consultation: Creative Rights in AI Coalition urges government to enforce copyright law through transparency without compromising rights". Creative Rights in AI Coalition.
- Department for Science, Innovation and Technology / Intellectual Property Office (18 March 2026). "Report on Copyright and Artificial Intelligence". HM Government.
- Eve, Martin Paul (24 November 2025). "Creative commons licenses and copyright may not stop academic work being used to train AI". LSE Impact Blog.
- Hansen, Dave (5 May 2026). "Surprise: Elsevier is Suing Meta For You?". Authors Alliance.
- House of Lords Communications and Digital Committee (6 March 2026). "UK creative industries face a clear and present danger from generative AI". House of Lords Communications and Digital Committee.
- IFLA (29 April 2025). "Realising potential, supporting users: IFLA Statement on Copyright and Artificial Intelligence". International Federation of Library Associations and Institutions.
- Intellectual Property Office (17 December 2024). "Copyright and Artificial Intelligence: Consultation". HM Government.
- Lazarova, Ana (8 July 2024). "Exploring the Intersection of AI, Text and Data Mining, and Copyright: A Reflection on the Stockholm Conference". Knowledge Rights 21.
- National Union of Journalists (10 September 2025). "TUC Congress 2025: threat of AI to jobs and rights takes centre stage". National Union of Journalists.
- OpenAI (2 April 2025). "Our response to the UK's copyright consultation". OpenAI.
- Public First (2026). "Text and Data Mining and its value to the UK economy". Public First.
- Rodriguez, Michael (2 July 2025). "The Route to an Open Scholarly Ecosystem Runs through CC BY". Katina Magazine. doi:10.1146/katina-070225-1.
- SCONUL (27 February 2025). "SCONUL and UCISA respond to the UK government Copyright and AI consultation". Society of College, National and University Libraries.
- Springer Nature (16 July 2024). "Who grants permission to use NC-ND content in commercial or derivative contexts?". Springer Nature Support.
- Taplin, Ben (19 June 2024). "Guidance on resisting restrictive AI clauses in licences". National Centre for AI (Jisc).
- techUK (26 February 2025). "AI, creativity, and copyright: finding the right balance". techUK.
- techUK (6 March 2026). "techUK Response to the Lords Communications and Digital Committee Report, 'AI, Copyright and the Creative Industries'". techUK.
- techUK (18 March 2026). "A reset, not a retreat, on AI copyright". techUK.
- Trapova, Alina (30 December 2025). "Copyright and AI policy in the UK in 2025". Kluwer Copyright Blog.
- U.S. Copyright Office (6 May 2025). "Copyright and Artificial Intelligence, Part 3: Generative AI Training" (PDF). U.S. Copyright Office.
- UCL Library Services (8 August 2018). "The text and data mining (TDM) exception". UCL Library Services.
- White, Benjamin (3 September 2024). "Undermining Scientific Research". Knowledge Rights 21.
- White, Ben (11 March 2026). "The UK's Copyright Laws Will Hobble Its AI Ambitions". Knowledge Rights 21.
- Writers' Guild of Great Britain (2026). "Writers and AI". Writers' Guild of Great Britain.
