= Cargilfield Preparatory School =

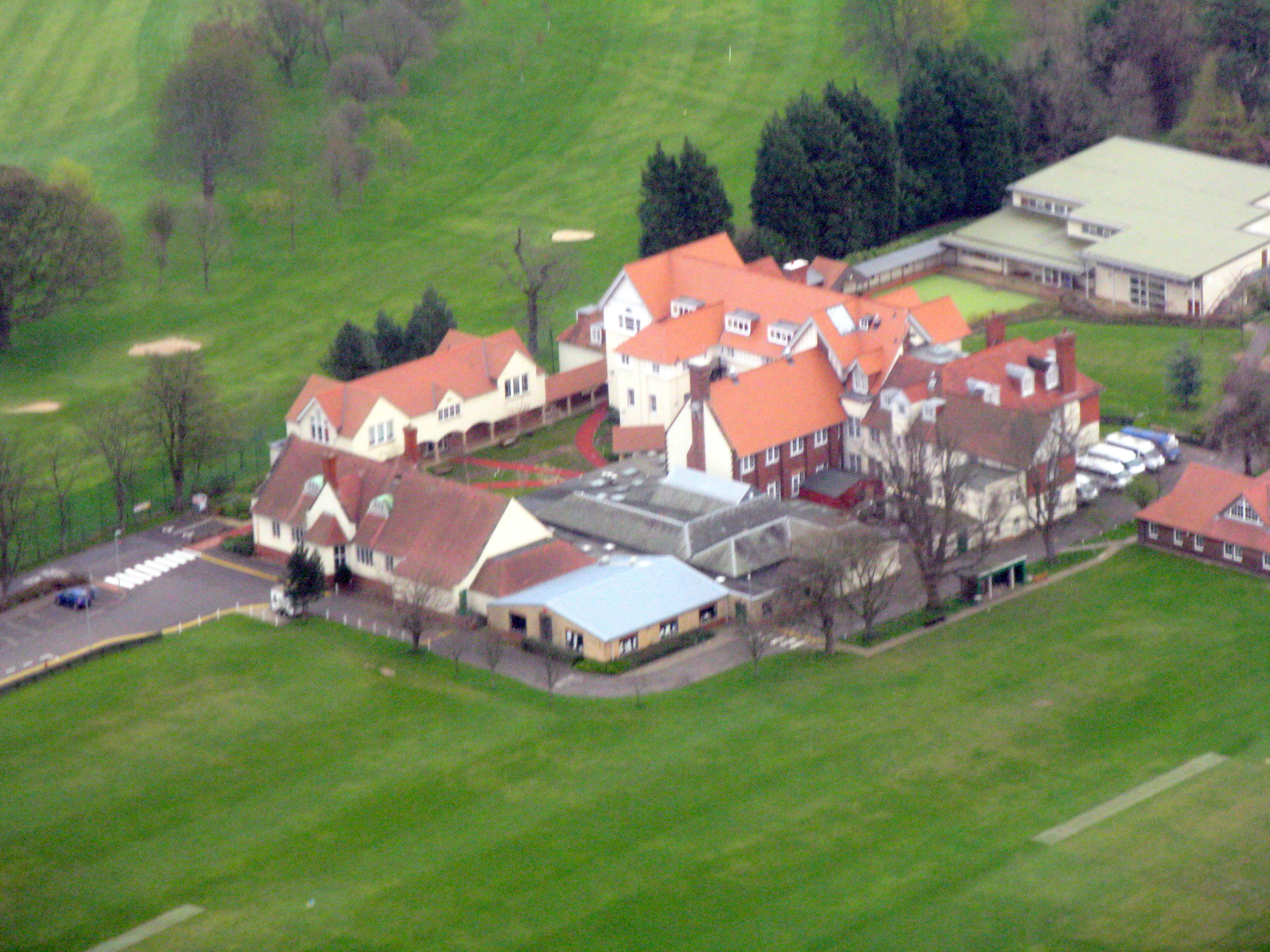

Location
- 45 Gamekeeper's Road; Edinburgh, EH4 6HU; Scotland
- Coordinates: 55.96971°N 3.30004°W

Information
- Type: Preparatory school Day & Boarding School
- Motto: Deo Custode ("With God as [a] guardian")
- Religious affiliation: Church of Scotland
- Established: 1873
- Founder: Rev Daniel Charles Darnell
- Headmaster: Colin MacIntosh
- Gender: Co-educational
- Age: 3 to 13
- Enrolment: 322
- Houses: Bruce, Graham, Stuart, Wallace,
- Colours: Red, Navy blue, White
- Website: http://www.cargilfield.com/

Listed Building – Category B
- Official name: 45 Gamekeeper’s Road, Cargilfield School, Including Chapel, Nursery, Cricket Pavilion, Boundary Walls, Gatepiers and Gates
- Designated: 24 February 1997; 29 years ago
- Reference no.: LB43929

Cargilfield Preparatory School is a Scottish private co-educational boarding and prep school in Edinburgh, Scotland.

== History ==
Cargilfield was founded in 1873 by Rev Daniel Charles Darnell an Episcopalian and former master at Rugby School and was the first independent preparatory school in Scotland. Originally, the school was located at Cargilfield, a large villa on South Trinity Road in the Trinity area of Edinburgh. It was sometimes referred to as Cargilfield Trinity School. It largely served as a feeder school to nearby Fettes College.

In 1899, the school relocated to Barnton.

In the period 2003–2012, the headmaster was John Elder. Among the changes he made to the school was the abolition of homework.

In 2014, the UK government named the school in a list of 25 UK employers which had failed to pay workers the national minimum wage, for underpaying an artist in residence by £3,739. The school responded that it had rectified this situation as soon as it was made aware of it, and apologised.

The school has reached the finals of the UKMT Team Mathematics Challenge competition in five consecutive years (2013, 2014, 2015, 2016, and 2017. )

== Notable former pupils ==
See also Category:People educated at Cargilfield School

- James Balfour-Melville (1882–1915), cricketer and soldier
- Robin Barbour KCVO MC (1921–2014), Church of Scotland minister and author
- Torquhil Campbell, 13th Duke of Argyll (born 1968)
- John Lorne Campbell of Canna (1906-1996) landowner and folklorist
- Alan Archibald Campbell-Swinton (1863–1930), electrical engineer
- Euan Hillhouse Methven Cox (1893–1977), botanist and horticulturist
- George Denholm (1908–1997), Second World War flying ace
- Thomas Gillespie (1892–1914), Olympic rower
- Sandy Gunn, photographic reconnaissance Spitfire pilot, executed in 1944 after the Great Escape
- Sir William Oliphant Hutchison (1889–1970), portrait and landscape painter
- Douglas Jamieson, Lord Jamieson (1880–1952), Unionist politician and judge
- Logie Bruce Lockhart (1921–2020), Scotland international rugby union footballer and headmaster
- Andrew Lownie (born 1961), historian and author
- Hugh Mackenzie (1913–1996), Royal Navy officer
- Donald M. MacKinnon (1913–1994), philosopher and theologian
- Sir Thomas Stewart Macpherson (1920–2014), soldier
- Duncan Menzies, Lord Menzies (born 1953), judge of the Supreme Courts of Scotland
- Victor Noel-Paton, Baron Ferrier (1900–1992), soldier and business man
- William Robert Ogilvie-Grant (1863–1924), ornithologist
- Lewis Robertson (1883–1914), Scotland rugby footballer and soldier
- William Roy Sanderson (1907–2008), minister, Moderator of the General Assembly of the Church of Scotland in 1967
- Sir Samuel Strang Steel of Philiphaugh Bt, landowner and Conservative politician.
- George Younger, 4th Viscount Younger of Leckie (1931-2003), Conservative politician and banker
