= Youngme Moon =

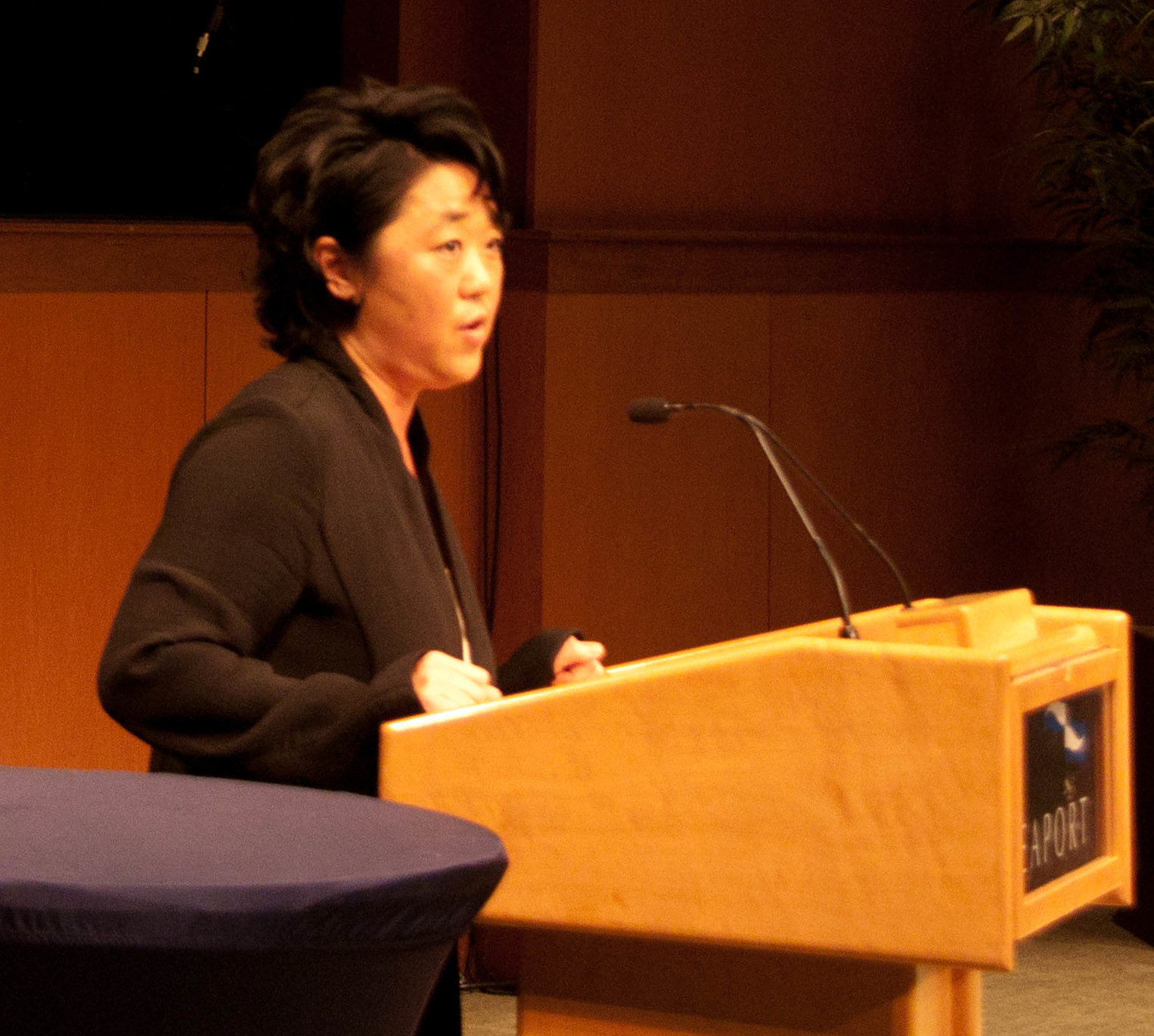
Youngme Moon speaking in 2010

Youngme Moon is the Donald K. David Professor of Business Administration at Harvard Business School. At HBS, Professor Moon has held numerous leadership positions, including Senior Associate Dean for the MBA Program, Senior Associate Dean for Strategy and Innovation, and has launched a number of strategic innovations such as the MBA FIELD curriculum, and the HBX Learning Platform. Moon has received the HBS Award for Teaching Excellence on multiple occasions and currently offers one of the most popular courses in the MBA program. She is also the inaugural recipient of the Hellman Faculty Fellowship, awarded for distinction in research.

== Research and Teaching ==
Moon's research and course development focuses on the intersection of business, branding, and culture. Her bestselling first book, Different, which Time magazine referred to as “a poetic paean to originality,” was published by Random House in 2010. Her ideas have been published in a variety of academic and business journals, including the Harvard Business Review. Moon's research has also been featured in The Wall Street Journal and Forbes. She has published and sold more than a million case studies on companies ranging from Microsoft to IKEA to Starbucks. Moon was among the top 40 case authors consistently, since the list was first published in 2016 by The Case Centre. She ranked 12th in 2018/19, 11th in 2017/18, sixth in 2016/17 and eighth in 2015/16.

She is the first Asian-American woman to receive tenure at Harvard Business School.

== Career ==
Moon has served on the boards of Unilever, Rakuten, Sweetgreen, Warby Parker, Mastercard, Riot Games and Groq.

Moon received her M.A. and Ph.D. from Stanford University, and her B.A. from Yale University. Prior to joining Harvard Business School, she was on the faculty at Massachusetts Institute of Technology.

In June 2022, Moon was appointed a non-executive director of Multiverse.

== Additional sources ==
- Harvard Business School, "Youngme Moon". Faculty & Research. (http://www.hbs.edu/faculty/Pages/profile.aspx?facId=6589)
- Sachs, Andrea. (June 28, 2010). "To copy or not to copy? Making the case for successful imitators and innovators." (http://content.time.com/time/magazine/article/0,9171,1997453,00.html). Time magazine.
- Murray, Alan. (November 19, 2011). "Gift Guide: Best of Business." (https://www.wsj.com/articles/SB10001424052970204190504577038263244281128). The Wall Street Journal.
- Henderson, Maureen J. (April 30, 2013), "Why It's Better For Your Career To Be Loathed Than Liked." (https://www.forbes.com/sites/jmaureenhenderson/2013/04/30/why-its-better-for-your-career-to-be-loathed-than-liked/). Forbes.
- Youngme Moon (2010), "Different: Escaping the Competitive Herd", Crown Books/Random House.
- Avid Technology, Inc. Investor Relations. (http://ir.avid.com/index.cfm).
- Zulily. How zulily works. (http://www.zulily.com/howzulilyworks).
