= William Roy Sanderson =

Scottish minister

William Roy Sanderson (23 September 1907 – 19 June 2008) was a Scottish minister who served as Moderator of the General Assembly of the Church of Scotland in 1967. In 1961 he had organised the first meeting between a moderator and the pope. He was chaplain in ordinary to Queen Elizabeth II in Scotland.

== Life ==
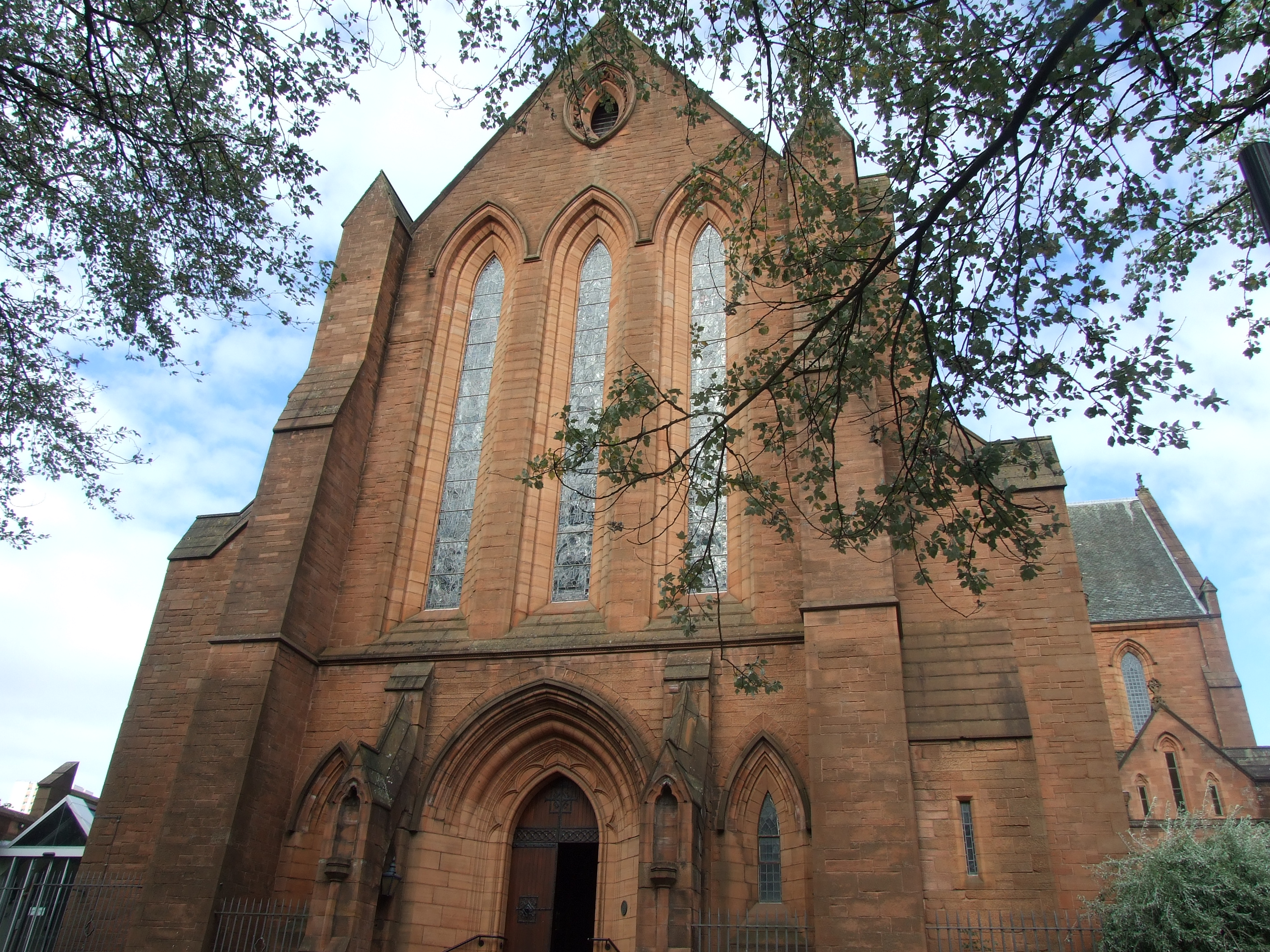
Barony Church, Glasgow

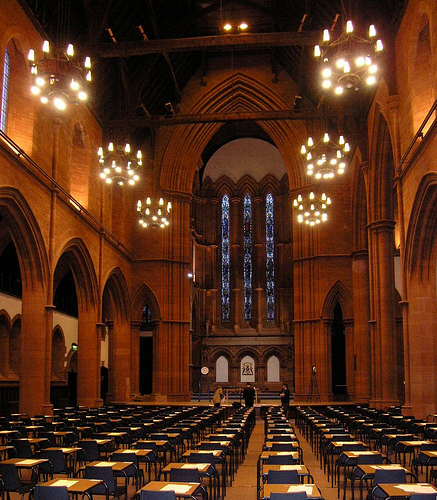
interior Barony Hall

He was born on 23 September 1907 at Talbot House, 216 Ferry Road in Leith, the son of Arthur Sanderson (killed in Gallipoli in 1915) and grandson of William Sanderson, a prominent local whisky distiller and founder of William Sanderson & Co., creators of VAT 69 whisky. Although initially known as William, he was known in adult life as Roy Sanderson. He was educated at Cargilfield Preparatory School, then Edinburgh Academy and Fettes College. He studied modern classics at the University of Oxford, graduating in 1929, and then returned to Edinburgh to study divinity at the University of Edinburgh.

In 1933 he was ordained as assistant at St Giles Cathedral in Edinburgh. In 1935 he was given his first church: St Andrews Church in Lochgelly, Fife. In 1939 he was translated to the Barony, Glasgow, as colleague and successor to Very Revd Dr John White. The church was in age of creation second in Glasgow to Glasgow Cathedral. In 1940 he served as a chaplain with the Church of Scotland Huts and Canteens in France and was evacuated from St Malo. He served as an air raid warden in Kelvinside during the Clydebank Blitz. The University of Glasgow awarded him an honorary doctorate (DD) in 1959. In 1963, after 24 years in Glasgow, he moved to serve the combined parishes of Whittingehame and Stenton, in East Lothian.

From 1960 to 1965 he was convenor of the church panel on doctrine and served as convenor of the general administration committee of the General Assembly from 1965 to 1970, technically pausing these duties for his period as Moderator 1967/8. He was influential in the ordination of female ministers and helped Mary Levison achieve her position as the Church of Scotland's first female minister. From 1961 to 1971 he advised both BBC Scotland and Scottish Television on religious affairs. He was a Governor of Fettes College 1967 to 1977.

He conducted the marriage of Leo Blair to his first wife Hazel, the parents of Tony Blair.

He retired to North Berwick and died in Dunbar on 19 June 2008, aged 100.

The Barony Church was deconsecrated and as the Barony Hall now forms part of the University of Strathclyde.

== Family ==
In 1941 he married Muriel Easton in Glasgow. They had two daughters and three sons.
