= Nick Blair =

British entrepreneur

- Born: Nicholas Blair; 6 December 1985 (age 40)
- Education: University of Oxford
- Occupation: Entrepreneur
- Parent(s): Tony Blair (father); Cherie Blair (mother)
- Relatives: Euan Blair (brother)

Nicholas Blair (born 6 December 1985) is a British entrepreneur. He is the co-founder and chairman of Skyral, a defence modelling and simulation company. Earlier in his career he worked as a football agent. He is the son of the former Prime Minister of the United Kingdom Tony Blair and the barrister Cherie Blair.

== Early life and education ==
Blair was born in 1985, the son of Tony and Cherie Blair and the grandson of Leo Blair on his father's side, and Tony Booth on his mother's. He has one older brother, Euan, and two younger siblings, Kathryn and Leo. He attended London Oratory School before studying history at the University of Oxford.

== Career ==
=== Early career ===
After graduating from Oxford, Blair worked as a teacher.

Blair was later registered as an agent with the Football Association. He represented Mexican internationals Héctor Herrera and Marco Fabián.

=== Skyral ===
Blair co-founded Skyral, a defence modelling and simulation company which was spun out of Improbable in 2023 following its acquisition by NOIA Capital and Kingsway. He serves as chairman of Skyral Group. In June 2025, Skyral announced a $20 million Series A funding round led by NOIA Capital.

=== Pyra Group ===
Blair founded Pyra Group, reported to be a defence technology start-up, in November 2025 and is preparing to launch it in 2026. The Daily Telegraph reported that Blair is seeking initial investment, reportedly up to $200 million.
