= Quantexa =

British software company

- Industry: data analysis
- Founded: 2016; 10 years ago
- Founder: Alexon Bell, Felix Hoddinott, Imam Hoque, Jamie Hutton, Laura Hutton, Vishal Marria
- Headquarters: London, United Kingdom
- Products: SaaS
- Number of employees: 800+ (2025)
- Website: quantexa.com

Quantexa is a UK-based software company that develops artificial intelligence-based applications for data analytics and decision-making. The company was founded in 2016 and is headquartered in London, with operations in North America, Europe, and the Asia-Pacific region.

As of 2025, Quantexa reported a valuation of $2.6 billion and provides services to organizations in over 70 countries. Investors include Warburg Pincus, HSBC, and the Ontario Teachers’ Pension Plan.

== History ==
Quantexa was founded in London in 2016 by several co-founders, including Jamie Hutton, Richard Seewald, Imam Hoque, Felix Hoddinott, and Vishal Marria, who also serves as the company's chief executive officer.

The company was established to develop tools intended to address limitations in traditional data analysis methods, particularly those related to identifying hidden connections across large datasets. The name "Quantexa" is derived from the company's focus on quantitative methods and data analysis.

In 2023, Quantexa acquired Dublin-based AI firm Aylien.

In April 2023, the company completed a Series E funding round, raising $129 million at a valuation of approximately $1.8 billion, marking its entry into "unicorn" status.

In October 2024, the company reported annual recurring revenue (ARR) exceeding $100 million.

In early 2025, Quantexa participated in the World Economic Forum's Unicorn Program, which supports high-growth technology companies.

In March 2025, Quantexa completed a Series F funding round of $175 million, led by Teachers' Venture Growth, the venture arm of the Ontario Teachers' Pension Plan. That August, the company was reported to be considering a 2026 IPO.

The company formed a partnership with Zurich in October 2025, the first insurer to add its AI-based Decision Intelligence platform for fraud detection.
