= Euan Blair =

English businessman (born 1984)

Euan Blair MBE
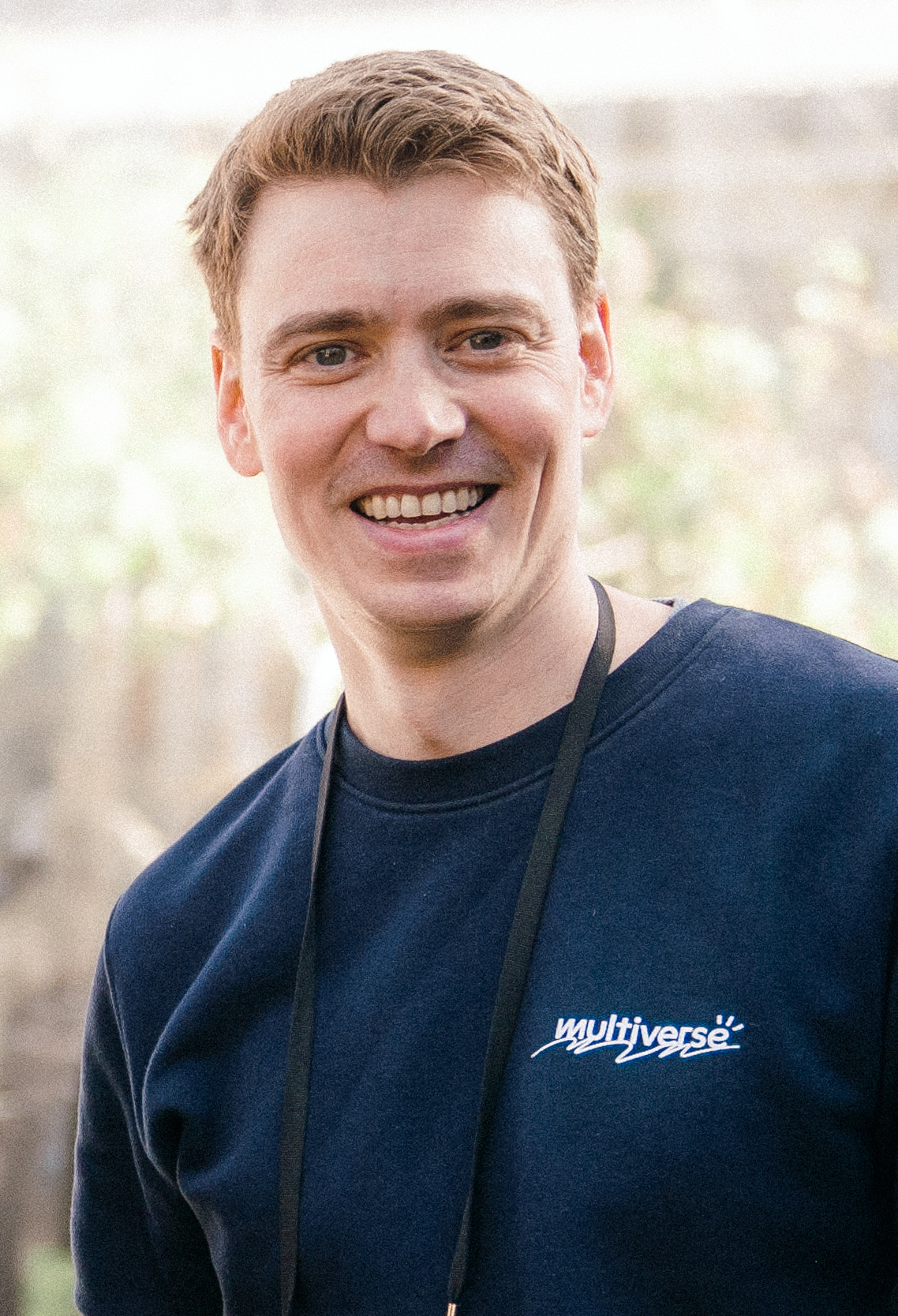
- Blair in 2022
- Born: Euan Anthony Blair; 19 January 1984 (age 42); London, England
- Education: London Oratory School; University of Bristol; Yale University
- Spouse: Suzanne Ashman (m. 2013)
- Children: 2
- Parents: Tony Blair (father); Cherie Blair (mother)
- Relatives: Nick Blair (brother); William Blair (uncle); Tony Booth (maternal grandfather); Leo Blair (paternal grandfather)

Euan Anthony Blair (born 19 January 1984) is a British businessman who is the co-founder and chief executive of the apprenticeships company Multiverse. He is the eldest son of the former British prime minister Tony Blair and lawyer Cherie Blair.

== Early life and education ==
Euan Anthony Blair was born on 19 January 1984 and was named Euan after two people: the artist Euan Uglow and a school friend of Tony Blair.

Blair was educated at St Joan of Arc Roman Catholic Primary School and the London Oratory School, a highly regarded Catholic school in Fulham, London. At the Oratory, he was appointed one of the four deputy head pupils for his final year at the school.

Blair graduated with a B.A. in ancient history from the University of Bristol in 2005, having attained a 2:1 (upper second class) honours degree.

== Early career ==
Blair spent three months as an unpaid intern with the Republican David Dreier and Republican Party staff of the Rules Committee of the United States House of Representatives. He then worked in the office of the "Blue Dog" Democrat Jane Harman. Blair cut short his internship with Harman in May 2006 after a fortnight; a statement from Harman's office cited Blair's graduate school plans, and offers from Harvard's Kennedy School and Yale.

In early 2006, Blair had two weeks of work experience with the London public relations company Finsbury Limited. In 2008, he graduated from Yale University's MacMillan Center with an M.A. in international relations. He accepted this place after being awarded a £50,000 ($100,000) scholarship.

== Career ==
In 2016, Blair and his friend Sophie Adelman jointly founded the company WhiteHat which provides apprenticeships for school leavers. WhiteHat was rebranded to Multiverse in 2021. The EdTech start-up provides apprenticeships in the UK and USA, specialising in data and technology. Multiverse delivers nine apprenticeship programmes that range from Level 3 (the equivalent of three A-Levels) to Level 6 (the equivalent of a university degree). The company was judged as "Needs Attention" in its most recent (February 2026) inspection by Ofsted.

In 2018, the company announced a $4 million seed round led by the Silicon Valley investor Lightspeed Venture Partners. In September 2021, Multiverse raised $130 million in a Series C raise at a valuation of $875 million. In June 2022, Multiverse raised $220 million in a Series D raise at a valuation of $1.7 billion.

In 2023, the company had sustained a loss every year, reporting a loss of £10.9 million in the year to 31 March 2021, on revenues of £10.1 million. In June 2022, the company was valued at £1.4bn in a fundraising round driven by US venture capital firms, valuing Blair's stake in the company at £420m. Losses rose to £40.5m on revenue of £45.2m for the financial year ending in March 2023.

Blair was appointed Member of the Order of the British Empire (MBE) in the 2022 Birthday Honours for services to education.

Blair was listed in the Sunday Times Rich List for the first time in May 2024, with an estimated net worth of £375 million. Blair re-entered the list in 2025 with a net worth of £350 million.

As of January 2026, Blair owns around 20 per cent of Multiverse and receives a salary of £246,000 as chief executive of the company.

== Media coverage ==
When the Millennium Dome was in the planning stages, Tony Blair proposed that the Dome must pass the "Euan test" and satisfy what his 13-year-old would want on a day out.

The incident for which Blair first attracted significant attention was in 2000 when, aged 16, he was found by police intoxicated in Leicester Square, having spent the night with friends celebrating the completion of his GCSE exams. He apologised for the incident, and was neither prosecuted nor formally cautioned.

In 2001, Blair applied to Trinity College, Oxford. His parents made a formal complaint to the Press Complaints Commission that media reports represented an intrusion, and the complaint was upheld. He later took a place at the University of Bristol instead.

In 2006, it was reported in The Sunday Times that Blair had worked as a runner for the film V for Vendetta when it was filmed around the Palace of Westminster in summer 2005. The Conservative MP David Davies and the magazine Private Eye suggested that Blair's involvement was a contributing factor to the granting of access to the location for filming. However, Nick Daubeny, the location manager for the film, denied that Blair's involvement had helped in any way, saying that Blair had been offered the job after they had worked together during the filming of Band of Brothers in 2001.

== Personal life ==
Blair was baptised and brought up Catholic.

In 2005, Blair was romantically linked to Luciana Berger by the press. Following such reports, Blair sent a fax from Labour party headquarters to national newspapers saying, "I want to make it clear that Luciana Berger is not, and has never been, my girlfriend."

In 2013, Blair married his long-term girlfriend Suzanne Ashman at All Saints' Church, Wotton Underwood, Buckinghamshire. The couple have two children and live in London. In 2022, it was reported that Blair and Ashman had bought a townhouse in London for £22 million.
