= Isomorphic Labs =

Subsidiary of Alphabet

Isomorphic Labs Limited
- Type: Subsidiary
- Industry: Drug discovery
- Founded: 24 February 2021; 5 years ago
- Founder: Demis Hassabis
- Headquarters: London, England
- Key people: Demis Hassabis (CEO); Max Jaderberg (President); Miles Congreve (CSO); Ben Wolf (CMO); Sarah Korman (CBO, CLO); Sarah Skerratt (CRO); Beverley Mallon (CPO)
- Owner: Alphabet Inc.
- Website: www.isomorphiclabs.com

Isomorphic Labs Limited is a British multinational artificial intelligence company based in London, England. Isomorphic Labs was founded by Demis Hassabis, who is the CEO, to improve human health by advancing the drug discovery process. The company was incorporated on February 24, 2021 and announced on November 4, 2021. It was established under Alphabet Inc. as a spin-off from its AI research lab DeepMind, which Hassabis co-founded and chairs.

Isomorphic Labs was inspired by DeepMind's AlphaFold 2 technology, which predicts a protein's three-dimensional structure from its amino acid sequence with high accuracy. The company has since developed beyond AlphaFold, creating proprietary AI models for drug design across multiple modalities, known as the Isomorphic Labs Drug Design Engine (IsoDDE).

== History ==
In December 2022, Isomorphic Labs announced its second office location in Lausanne, Switzerland.

In January 2024, Isomorphic Labs announced separate collaborations with Novartis AG and Eli Lilly and Company to work together on AI drug discovery and research. The deal with Novartis sought to utilize AI to identify molecules against three undisclosed targets, while the deal with Eli Lilly focused on the discovery of small molecules against an undisclosed number of targets.

In May 2024, Google DeepMind and Isomorphic Labs announced the release of AlphaFold 3, a foundational AI model for biomolecule structure prediction. AlphaFold 3 improved on previous iterations, displaying increased accuracy in modeling protein interactions and its modeling capabilities. The platform was developed by training it on approximately 100,000 protein structures. The AlphaFold platform has since identified the structure of over 200 million proteins, nearly all known to researchers, and as of December 2025, it has been used by more than 3.3 million researchers from over 190 countries.

In February 2025, Isomorphic Labs extended its partnership with Novartis, announcing three additional research programs within its original agreement.

In April 2025 Isomorphic Labs raised $600 million in its first external funding round, led by Thrive Capital. In June of that year, the company appointed Dr. Ben B. Wolf as its chief medical officer and opened its third office located in Cambridge, Massachusetts.

In January 2026, former Isomorphic Labs chief AI officer Max Jaderberg was appointed as president of the company, succeeding Colin Murdoch. In that same month, Isomorphic Labs partnered with Johnson & Johnson to collaborate on a cross-modality, multi-target research campaign.

In February 2026, the company announced progress of its drug design engine (IsoDDE) in a technical report, which doubled the performance of AlphaFold 3 on a protein-ligand structure prediction generalization benchmark, predicts small molecule binding-affinities with higher accuracy than physics-based methods at a small fraction of the time and cost, and identified new binding pockets on target proteins using only the amino acid sequence. IsoDDE operates across multiple modalities, including proteins, small molecules, and antibodies, demonstrating strong generalization to molecules that differ substantially from those encountered during training.

In May 2026, the company raised $2.1 billion in a funding round led by Thrive Capital, which included participation from returning investors Alphabet and GV, and new investors MGX, Temasek, CapitalG, and the UK Sovereign AI Fund.

By November 2026, the company's internal drug discovery pipeline remained in preclinical development across oncology, immunology, and inflammation programs, ahead of its targeted entry into first-in-human clinical trials. That month, Isomorphic Labs raised $5 billion in a Series C funding round co-led by Greenoaks and Sequoia Capital, with participation from Andreessen Horowitz, Alphabet and existing investors.
