= William Blair (judge) =

British retired judge and brother of Tony Blair (born 1950)

Sir William Blair KC
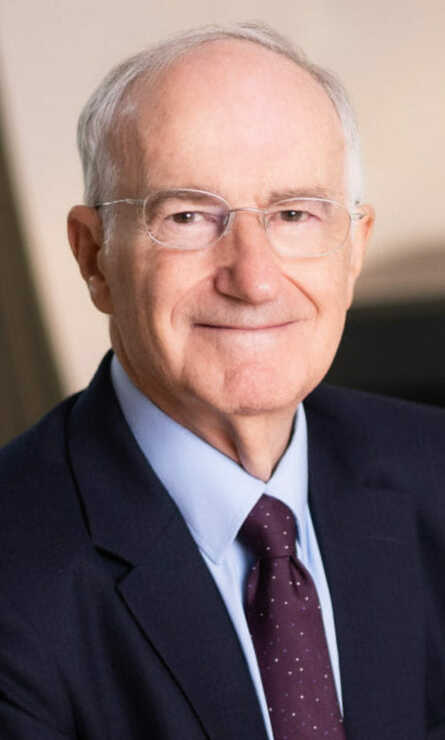
- Official portrait, c. 2020

Deputy High Court Judge of the Hong Kong High Court
- Incumbent
- Assumed office 2 March 2018
- Appointed by: Geoffrey Ma

Justice of the High Court
- In office 27 February 2008 – 1 December 2017
- Appointed by: Elizabeth II

Personal details
- Born: William James Lynton Blair; 31 March 1950 (age 76) Glasgow, Scotland
- Parent: Leo Blair (father)
- Relatives: Tony Blair (brother); Cherie Blair (sister-in-law); Euan Blair (nephew); Nicky Blair (nephew)
- Education: Balliol College, Oxford (BA); Inns of Court School of Law
- Occupation: Judge
- Profession: Lawyer; professor

Chinese name
- Traditional Chinese: 貝偉廉
- Simplified Chinese: 贝伟廉
Transcriptions
Standard Mandarin
- Hanyu Pinyin: Bèi Wěilián
Yue: Cantonese
- Yale Romanization: Bui Wāi-lìhm
- Jyutping: Bui3 Wai5-lim4

Sir William James Lynton Blair (born 31 March 1950) is a British judge, lawyer, and professor who has served as a deputy high court judge in the Hong Kong High Court since 2018, having previously served as a judge in the High Court of Justice from 2008 to 2017. He is also the elder brother of former British prime minister Tony Blair.

He is a Professor of Financial Law and Ethics at the Centre for Commercial Law Studies at Queen Mary University of London. Additionally, he served as a High Court Judge in England and Wales for nearly ten years, and was Judge in Charge of the Commercial Court from 2016.

In 2017, Blair rejoined 3 Verulam Buildings as an Associate Member and international arbitrator, and is now a member of 3VB's International Advisory and Dispute Resolution Unit (IADRU). He is the Chair of the Bank of England’s Enforcement Decision Making Committee (EDMC) and in 2018 was appointed to the International Commercial Expert Committee of the Supreme People’s Court of the People’s Republic of China. Blair was awarded an honorary degree in 2024 by the University of Glasgow.

== Early life ==
William James Lynton Blair was born on 31 March 1950 in Glasgow, Scotland as the eldest of three children born to Leo Charles Lynton Blair (1923–2012) and Hazel Elizabeth Rosaleen Blair (née Corscadden; 1923–1975). His father was the illegitimate son of two entertainers and was adopted as a baby by the Glasgow shipyard worker James Blair and his wife, Mary. His mother was the daughter of George Corscadden, a butcher and Orangeman who moved to Glasgow in 1916, and in 1923 returned to (and later died in) Ballyshannon, County Donegal, in Ireland. In Ballyshannon, Corscadden's wife, Sarah Margaret (née Lipsett), gave birth above the family's grocery shop to Blair's mother, Hazel.

Blair has a younger brother, Tony, the future British prime minister, and a younger sister, Sarah. Blair's first home was with his family at Paisley Terrace in the Willowbrae area of Edinburgh. During this period, his father worked as a junior tax inspector whilst studying for a law degree from the University of Edinburgh.

Blair's first relocation was when he was four years old. At the end of 1954, Blair's parents and their two sons moved from Paisley Terrace to Adelaide, South Australia. His father lectured in law at the University of Adelaide. In Australia, Blair's sister, Sarah, was born. The Blairs lived in the suburb of Dulwich close to the university. The family returned to the United Kingdom in mid-1958. They lived for a time with Hazel's mother and stepfather (William McClay) at their home in Stepps on the outskirts of north-east Glasgow. Blair's father accepted a job as a lecturer at Durham University, and moved the family to Durham when Blair was eight. It was the beginning of a long association Blair was to have with Durham.

== Career ==
Blair became a Queen's Counsel in 1984, appearing and advising in many domestic and international disputes and matters particularly in the financial field.

He was appointed a recorder in 1998. He became a deputy High Court judge in 2003 and was in the same year admitted as a barrister of the Eastern Caribbean Supreme Court in the Territory of the Virgin Islands.

On 4 February 2008, it was announced that Queen Elizabeth II had approved his appointment as a High Court judge, assigned to the Queen's Bench Division. He was sworn in on 27 February. In 2016 he became judge in charge of the Commercial Court.

He became a member of London's Financial Markets Law Committee in 2008.

In 2012, he became the first President of the Board of Appeal of the European Supervisory Authorities, serving until 2019.

He is or has been a visiting professor of law at the London School of Economics, Peking University Law School, East China University of Politics and Law and the University of Hong Kong. He has also been, since 1999, an Honorary Fellow of the Society for Advanced Legal Studies (1997), and an academic adviser to the Asian Institute of International Financial Law.

From 2001 to 2008 he served, part-time, as a chairman of the Financial Services and Markets Tribunal (Finsmat) and from 2003 to 2005 he was chairman of the Commercial Bar Association (Combar). He is also chairman of the International Monetary Law Committee of the International Law Association (2004-2021), and of the Qatar Financial Centre Regulatory Tribunal.

Along with Lord Woolf, the former Lord Chief Justice of England and Wales, he served as the Co-Convener of the inaugural Qatar Law Forum of Global Leaders in Law, held in Doha, Qatar, from 29–31 May 2009.

He retired as a High Court Judge on 1 December 2017 to take up a position as Professor of Financial Law and Ethics at the Centre for Commercial Law Studies, Queen Mary University of London.

Since 2018, as well as arbitration, he has also sat part-time as a Deputy Judge of the High Court of Hong Kong SAR (where he is given a Chinese name "貝理賢" by the Hong Kong Judiciary), and since 2017, acted as an international commercial court judge in the Qatar International Court. At the China International Commercial Court, he has spoken on legal issues.

He is a member of the Ethics Committee of Digital Catapult’s AI Machine Intelligence Garage.

== Publications ==
- Co-editor, Research Handbook on Ethics in Banking and Finance (Edward Elgar Publishing 2019)
- Co-editor, Banks and Financial Crime, the International Law of Tainted Money, 2nd edn (Oxford University Press, 2017)
- General editor of Bullen, Leake & Jacob's Precedents of Pleadings, 18th edition, Sweet & Maxwell, London, 2015
- Co-consultant editor of Butterworths Banking Law Handbook, 8th edition (December 2010)
- Co-author of Banking and Financial Services Regulation, 3rd edition, Butterworths, London, 2002
- Co-editor Encyclopaedia of Banking Law (Butterworths, London, 1999)
- Editor of Banks and Remedies, LLP, London, 1999
- Editor of Banks, Liability and Risk, 3rd edition, LLP, London, 2001
