= Leo Blair =

British barrister (1923–2012)

- Photograph of Blair in A Journey
- Born: Charles Leonard Augustus Parsons; 4 August 1923; Filey, Yorkshire, England
- Died: 16 November 2012 (aged 89); Shrewsbury, Shropshire, England
- Education: University of Edinburgh
- Occupations: Barrister; law lecturer
- Political party: Communist (1938–1941); Labour (1941–1945; from 1994); Conservative (1946–1994)
- Spouses: Hazel Corscadden McLay (m. 1948; died 1975) Olwen Guy (m. 1980; died 2012)
- Children: 3, including William and Tony
- Relatives: Euan Blair (grandson)
- Military career
- Branch: British Army
- Service years: 1942–1947
- Rank: Major
- Unit: Royal Corps of Signals
- Conflicts: Second World War

Leo Charles Lynton Blair (born Charles Leonard Augustus Parsons; 4 August 1923 – 16 November 2012) was a Scottish barrister and law lecturer at Durham University. He was the father of Tony Blair, a former prime minister of the United Kingdom, and William Blair, a High Court judge.

== Early life ==
Born Charles Leonard Augustus Parsons in Filey, East Riding of Yorkshire, England, he was the illegitimate son of travelling entertainers Charles Parsons (1887–1970), who used the stage name Jimmy Lynton, and Mary Augusta Ridgway Bridson (1886–1969), known as Celia Ridgway and a daughter of Augustus William Bridson (1849–1933) and Maria Emily Montford (1864–1944). The couple met on tour in England. Their hectic lifestyles prompted them to give up baby Leo, who was fostered out to (and later adopted by) a working-class couple, a Glasgow shipyard worker named James Blair and his wife Mary, taking their surname. On 2 June 1927, his biological parents married and tried to reclaim him, but Mary Blair refused to return him and later prevented him from contacting his birth parents. (Leo later had a reunion with his half-sister, Pauline Harding, née Tordiffe.)

Blair grew up in a tenement in Golspie Street, Govan, Glasgow, and attended Govan High School. When he left school, he worked as a copy boy on the Communist Party newspaper The Daily Worker. He was secretary of the Scottish Young Communist League from 1938 to 1941.

Blair next worked briefly in the Glasgow City Public Assistance Department before enlisting in the Royal Corps of Signals for service in the Second World War in 1942; he was demobilised with the acting rank of major in 1947.

He studied law at the University of Edinburgh, becoming a barrister and later, a university law lecturer.

== Marriage and children ==
Blair married Hazel Elizabeth Rosaleen Corscadden from a Protestant family in County Donegal, Ireland. They were married by the Rev. William Roy Sanderson, a future Moderator of the General Assembly of the Church of Scotland, at Barony Church in Glasgow. They had two sons, both of whom attended Fettes College (an independent school in Edinburgh), and a daughter. Their first son, William Blair, a banking and finance law specialist, became a High Court judge. Their second son, Anthony Charles Lynton Blair (Tony Blair), was born in 1953 and also became a barrister before becoming a politician and, in 1997, Prime Minister of the United Kingdom. At the end of 1954, the family moved to Adelaide, Australia, for 3 1/2 years, where Blair lectured in law at the University of Adelaide.

Blair and his family later returned to the United Kingdom, living in Durham, England, where Blair lectured in law at Durham University Law School. He was a member of St Cuthbert's Society, one of the university's collegiate bodies. In 1959, he was awarded a PhD from the University of Edinburgh for a thesis entitled "The legal status of the governmental employee". Despite having been a communist in his youth, Leo became active in the Conservative Party. He had ambitions to stand for Parliament in Durham, hoping to become a candidate in the 1964 general election, which were thwarted when he suffered a stroke in 1963 at the age of 40. Following Blair's stroke, he had to rely heavily on his wife Hazel to look after him.

== Later life ==
Blair joined the Labour Party when his son became its leader in 1994, citing pride at his son's achievements, his dissatisfaction with the Conservatives under John Major and his objection to railway privatisation. He had previously been "a huge supporter" of Conservative prime minister Margaret Thatcher.

Blair's first wife, Hazel (12 June 1923 – 28 June 1975), died of thyroid cancer. He remarried and lived in Shrewsbury, Shropshire, with his second wife, Olwen, until her death on 15 March 2012. Cherie and Tony Blair named their youngest son Leo after him.

Blair was a "militant atheist", according to his son Tony.

Blair died in Shrewsbury aged 89 on 16 November 2012.

== Academic work ==
Blair's book The Commonwealth Public Service (1958) was described by the journal Canadian Public Administration as "an excellent primer on the Australian Federal Public Service".
