= James E. Wise Jr. =

James E. Wise Jr., author, is a former naval aviator, intelligence officer, and Vietnam veteran, retired from the U.S. Navy in 1975 as a captain. He became a naval aviator in 1953 following graduation from Northwestern University. He served as an intelligence officer aboard the USS America and later as the commanding officer of various naval intelligence units. Since his retirement, Captain Wise has held several senior executive posts in private sector companies. His books include Dangerous Games: faces, incidents and casualties of the Cold War, The Silver Star, The Navy Cross, Stars in Blue, and U-505: The Final Journey. He is also the author of many historical articles in naval and maritime journals. Captain Wise lives in the Washington, DC, metropolitan area.
