= Suzanne Ashman =

British venture capitalist

Suzanne Ashman is a British venture capitalist and technology investor. In May 2026, she was appointed as the managing partner of the United Kingdom government's £500 million Sovereign AI Fund. She previously spent a decade as a general partner at the London-based venture capital firm LocalGlobe and its growth-stage fund Latitude, where she led investments in several notable technology companies.

== Early life and education ==
Ashman is the daughter of Jonathan Ashman, a British motor racing entrepreneur who was involved in staging the British Grand Prix, and Sedef Altinsoy, who was born in Turkey.

Ashman was educated at St Paul's Girls' School, an independent school in London. She went on to study Philosophy, Politics and Economics (PPE) at Trinity College, Oxford.

== Career ==
=== Early career ===
Ashman began her career at Social Finance, an impact investing firm, where she was part of the founding team. During her time there, she worked on developing social investment opportunities across healthcare, education, criminal justice, and employment, and was involved in the creation of the first Social Impact Bond.

Following her time at Social Finance, Ashman co-founded Notifyed, an educational technology startup designed to enable secure messaging between teachers, students, and parents to improve educational outcomes.

=== Venture capital ===
In February 2016, Ashman joined LocalGlobe, a London-based pre-seed and seed-stage venture capital firm founded by Robin Klein and his son Saul. She served as a General Partner at LocalGlobe for ten years, and from December 2018, she also served as a General Partner at Latitude, the firm's growth-stage fund (both funds operate under the parent company Phoenix Court Group).

During her tenure at LocalGlobe and Latitude, Ashman focused on investments in consumer and enterprise companies operating in regulated markets, with a particular interest in education, transport, agriculture, and the future of work. In 2017, Ashman was listed in the Forbes 30 Under 30 Europe list in the Finance category.

=== UK Tech Competitiveness Study ===
Between 2019 and 2020, Ashman served on the Tech Competitiveness Study Expert Panel, commissioned by the UK government's Department for Digital, Culture, Media and Sport. She co-authored the resulting report alongside Cindy Rose, Avid Larizadeh Duggan, Stephen Coleman, and Julia Hawkins. The study, published in May 2021, examined ways to strengthen the UK's position as a leading destination for digital businesses and recommended measures to close the digital skills gap, harness data and artificial intelligence for public good, and strengthen regional tech ecosystems.

=== Sovereign AI Fund ===
In May 2026, Ashman was appointed as the Managing Partner of the UK government's Sovereign AI Fund. The £500 million taxpayer-backed venture fund, launched in April 2026 and chaired by James Wise of Balderton Capital, was established to co-invest alongside private backers in early and growth-stage British artificial intelligence companies. After her appointment, the fund announced its investment in Isomorphic Labs, an AI drug discovery company founded by Sir Demis Hassabis.

== Personal life ==
Ashman is married to Euan Blair, a technology entrepreneur and the eldest son of former British Prime Minister Tony Blair and Cherie Blair.
