= Wayve =

British autonomous vehicle technology company

Wayve Technologies Ltd
- Type: Private
- Industry: Autonomous cars
- Founded: 21 August 2017; 9 years ago
- Founders: Amar Shah; Alex Kendall
- Headquarters: London, United Kingdom
- Key people: Alex Kendall, (CEO)
- Products: SaaS
- Number of employees: 1,000 (2026)
- Website: wayve.ai

Wayve Technologies Ltd is a British autonomous driving technology company focused on developing self-driving vehicle systems through end-to-end deep learning. Founded in 2017 by researchers from the University of Cambridge, Wayve’s approach eschews detailed 3D maps and hand-coded rules, in favour of a self-learning "AI driver" that learns from camera data and driving experience.

== History ==
Wayve was founded in Cambridge, England, on 21 August 2017, by Amar Shah and Alex Kendall, two machine learning PhD students at the University of Cambridge. Shah initially served as CEO while Kendall was CTO, and the pair set out to develop an unconventional self-driving car system using machine learning at every layer of the driving task. In May 2018, Wayve emerged from stealth mode with backing from early-stage investors. At this time the company had around 10 employees, and its advisory investors included Uber’s Chief Scientist, Zoubin Ghahramani, who shared Wayve’s vision of a learning-centric driving AI.

In 2019, Wayve achieved a milestone by training a car to drive autonomously on public roads it had never seen before, using only cameras, a basic GPS map, and end-to-end deep learning control. The company moved its base to London and secured $20 million in Series A funding in November 2019. This investment enabled Wayve to launch a pilot fleet of autonomous electric test vehicles in central London. During these trials, Wayve’s cars (such as retrofitted Jaguar I-Pace SUVs) began navigating London streets to prove the system’s ability.

In 2020, Shah departed the company, and Kendall became CEO.

The startup joined the Microsoft for Startups: Autonomous Driving program in 2020, leveraging Microsoft Azure’s cloud computing for training its models at scale. It also committed to testing exclusively on electric vehicles, and a goal to reduce carbon emissions.

In 2021, Wayve entered pilot programs with major UK retailers. It launched a 12-month autonomous delivery trial with supermarket chain Asda, and received a £10 million ($13.6 million) investment from online grocer Ocado Group as part of a partnership to develop self-driving grocery delivery vans. Ocado’s backing gave Wayve access to a fleet of delivery vans for data collection and testing (with human safety drivers present) to train in urban traffic.

In 2022, after a successful Series B funding round, the company extended road testing beyond the UK to other regions, and, by 2023, in multiple countries. The company began operating in the United States and in continental Europe.

In 2023, Wayve announced a collaboration with Nissan to integrate Wayve’s AI-driven software into its ProPilot ADAS system, slated to launch in fiscal year 2027.

Wayve received strategic investment from Uber, in 2024, and began joint development of ride-hailing services. To demonstrate scalability, Wayve conducted an “AI-500” roadshow project, driving in dozens of cities across Asia, Europe, and North America using the same AI model. By mid-2025, it had completed autonomous driving demos in 90 cities without prior high density mapping.

In April 2025, Wayve opened its first Asian research hub in Japan, with investment by SoftBank. That year, the company conducted driving tests in over 500 cities in Europe, North America and Japan without city-specific programming.

In February 2026, Nissan, Uber and Wayve announced their collaboration on robotaxi development, with the aim of launching a pilot programme in Tokyo by late 2026. Wayve also formed a strategic alliance with Mercedes-Benz and Stellantis on personal vehicle and robotaxi applications. In May 2026, Stellantis announced its intention to use Wayve's self-driving technology across its brands starting in 2028. In September 2026, Uber and Wayve launched autonomous Uber robotaxis in London using Wayve's technology.

== Finance ==
Wayve is backed by a mix of venture capital (VC) firms, corporate investors, and individuals. Its seed funding came from funds such as Compound (NYC) and Firstminute Capital (London), as well as Cambridge-based angel investors, in 2018. Academic Pieter Abbeel and Uber’s chief scientist, Zoubin Ghahramani, were early backers.

In November 2019, Wayve raised a $20 million Series A led by Eclipse Ventures, with participation from Balderton Capital and other prior investors. The Series A financing was used to fund the company’s autonomous trials in London, and marked the first time a European self-driving car startup had secured a U.S. VC as lead investor.

In October 2021, Ocado Group invested £10 million (approximately $13.6 million) in Wayve as a partner in autonomous grocery delivery. This brought Wayve’s total funding to around $60 million at that time. The Series B round followed in January 2022, when Wayve announced $200 million in funding led by Eclipse Ventures, with D1 Capital Partners, Moore Strategic Ventures, and Linse Capital. Balderton, Microsoft and Virgin Group joined. Baillie Gifford and Compound also participated; Ocado increased its stake; and Meta AI head Yann LeCun and Richard Branson also became investors.

Wayve’s Series C in May 2024 closed at $1.05 billion, led by Japan’s SoftBank Group. The funding round was the largest-ever for a UK AI company, and included Nvidia, and returning investors Microsoft and Eclipse Ventures, among others. Uber joined as a partner and a stakeholder. The Series C round increased Wayve’s total funding raised to about $1.3 billion from investors including SoftBank, Microsoft and Nvidia, and lifted Wayve’s valuation into “unicorn” status.

In February 2026, Wayve announced a $1.2 billion Series D funding round. Later that month, the company reported that $1.5 billion had been raised from, primarily, Mercedes-Benz, Stellantis, Nissan, and existing backers Uber, Microsoft and Nvidia, increasing Wayve's post-money valuation to $8.6 billion.

== Technology ==
Wayve adopted end-to-end deep learning and a vision-based sensor system. Unlike Waymo autonomous vehicles that depend on high-definition maps, hand-coded rules, and lidar sensors, Wayve’s platform learns to drive predominantly using camera data and machine learning. Wayve's approach, referred to as AV2.0, uses an end-to-end neural network to process driving data and generate vehicle-control outputs, rather than relying on a modular system of separately engineered perception, planning and control components. The approach is designed to operate without high-definition maps and to generalise across different driving environments. The company refers to its AI-driven driving software as an “Embodied AI” or AI Driver, emphasizing that the system learns from experience (real and simulated) to handle complex/novel situations rather than following programmed instructions, not unlike Tesla's approach.

The Wayve hardware-agnostic autonomy stack consists of a suite of video cameras, with basic automotive sensors mounted on the vehicle, and paired with onboard compute units that are powered by GPUs to run the AI models. This vision-only philosophy is similar to Tesla’s Autopilot/FSDB model, but Wayve’s solution is vehicle-agnostic and mapless. Wayve’s strategy is to provide its driving AI as an OEM-ready platform; it plans to license or embed its technology into vehicles made by established automakers rather than build cars. Wayve’s development vehicles use Nvidia’s Orin system-on-chip for running the AI model, although Kendall noted that the software can run on “whatever GPU [an automaker] already has in their vehicles” Wayve has built cloud infrastructure, largely on Microsoft Azure, to process this data, and uses simulation tools (known internally as the “Wayve Infinity” simulator) to generate and practice rare or dangerous scenarios.

== Corporate affairs ==
Wayve is privately held, headquartered in London, England. Its primary research and development office is in London's Kings Cross area. The company was incorporated as Wayve Technologies Ltd. Wayve has a presence in the U.S., in Silicon Valley); in Canada, with a research hub in Vancouver; in Yokohama, Japan; in Leonberg, Germany; and in Herzliya, Israel.

The leadership team includes research scientists and engineers with backgrounds in computer vision, robotics, and automotive systems. President Erez Dagan was hired in 2024, following two decades at Mobileye; chief scientist Jamie Shotton is formerly of Microsoft Research. Alex Kendall is originally from New Zealand with a PhD in computer vision from Cambridge. He became CEO in 2020.
