= Artificial intelligence industry in Italy =

Artificial Intelligence Industry in Italy
- Total value of Artificial Intelligence Industry in Italy: ▲€ 1.2 billion (2024)

The artificial intelligence industry in Italy is growing and supports industrial development. In 2024 it reached a new record, reaching 1.2 billion euros with a growth of +58% compared to 2023. While in 2025, the growth of artificial intelligence in the industrial application was even greater than in 2024 both in terms of value and application to industrial sectors. In the 2026 Global Index on Responsible AI, Italy scored 72.71. It was ranked 2nd of 135 countries and ahead of 99% of those assessed, 18.5 points above the Europe average (54.2) and 20.6 points above the high-income average (52.1).

== History ==
The roots of AI research in Italy extend back to the 1970s, when Italian scholars began exploring automated reasoning, programming language semantics, and pattern recognition. Researchers such as those involved in early projects at the National Research Council and various universities laid the groundwork for subsequent academic and industrial developments in the field.

During this period, the focus was predominantly on developing algorithms for automated theorem proving and building systems to reason about complex mathematical problems. This era witnessed the birth of methodologies that would later influence numerous AI subfields, from natural language processing (NLP) to robotics.

=== Institutional milestones and academic contributions ===
A turning point in the Italian AI landscape was the formation of the Italian Association for Artificial Intelligence (AIxIA) in 1988. Founded by academics, including Luigia Carlucci Aiello, the association established a platform for collaboration between universities, research centers, and industry. Led by Aiello, AIIA played a role in promoting research, organizing national conferences, and fostering international partnerships that connected Italy's AI community to global networks.

At the same time, professors such as Roberto Navigli and numerous practitioners contributed to the advancement of AI in Italy. Navigli has worked in multilingual NLP, including the creation of BabelNet, and led the Minerva project.

=== Industrial AI ===
Over recent decades, numerous national and European initiatives supported by funding from programs such as the National Recovery and Resilience Plan (PNRR) have spurred the transition from theoretical research to practical applications. Industrial sectors including manufacturing, banking, and healthcare increasingly embraced AI-driven automation, while research institutions collaborated with industrial partners to deploy cutting-edge solutions.

In recent years, Italy has also seen the establishment of specialized research centers and institutes aimed at bridging the gap between academic innovation and industrial application. These initiatives indicate a broader national commitment to integrating AI into the fabric of Italian industry.

== Recent developments ==
=== Emergence of generative AI ===
A landmark in Italy's modern AI evolution is the development of Minerva AI. Developed by the Sapienza NLP research group at Sapienza University of Rome and led by Professor Roberto Navigli, Minerva represents the first family of large language models (LLMs) trained from scratch with a primary focus on the Italian language.

==== Minerva 7B ====
The latest iteration, Minerva 7B, has 7 billion parameters and has been trained on an extensive corpus of over 1.5 trillion words. By using advanced instruction tuning techniques, Minerva 7B is able to produce highly accurate, coherent, and contextually sensitive responses addressing common issues such as hallucinations and inappropriate content generation. This breakthrough sets a benchmark for transparent, open-source AI development in the country. Minerva's development, carried out within the FAIR (Future Artificial Intelligence Research) project in collaboration with CINECA and supported by supercomputing resources like the Leonardo (supercomputer), aligns closely with Italy's cultural and linguistic heritage.

=== Establishment of AI4I ===
The recent establishment of the Istituto Italiano per l’Intelligenza Artificiale (AI4I) is part of Italy's strategy to improve its industrial competitiveness in AI. This dedicated institute aims to bridge the gap between research institutions and industrial enterprises; promote training and R&D support to nurture the next generation of Italian AI experts; and enhance national competitiveness.

This initiative is expected to serve as a hub for applied AI research, driving innovations that are tailored to the specific needs of Italian industry and public administration.

=== Benefits of InvestAI ===
Italy's AI industry stands to benefit from the European InvestAI initiative, a plan unveiled at the recent AI Action Summit in Paris. InvestAI is an effort by the European Commission to mobilize €200 billion for AI investments, with a dedicated €20 billion fund earmarked for building AI gigafactories. These gigafactories are planned as large-scale hubs for training advanced, complex AI models using approximately 100,000 last-generation AI chips.

For Italy, this investment presents several major opportunities:

- Access to State-of-the-Art Infrastructure: Italian companies, research institutions, and start-ups can leverage the gigafactories’ immense computational resources, enabling them to train highly sophisticated language models and other AI systems.
- Enhanced Competitiveness and Collaboration: With InvestAI's layered funding model where EU funds help de-risk private investments Italian firms can access capital more readily. This will bolster public–private partnerships and create a more dynamic AI ecosystem that spans from academic research to industrial applications.
- Alignment with National and Regional Initiatives: The Istituto Italiano per l’Intelligenza Artificiale (AI4I), based in Turin, is already recognized as a strategic asset by both Italy and the European Union. As the main recipient of InvestAI funds in Italy, AI4I will play a pivotal role in implementing these investments locally, fostering innovation in sectors like manufacturing, healthcare and aerospace.

Commission President Ursula von der Leyen emphasized that InvestAI is designed to democratize AI innovation throughout Europe by ensuring that even smaller companies have access to high-performance computing power. For Italy, this means not only keeping pace with global leaders but also harnessing European-scale investments to transform its AI industry and drive economic growth.

== See also ==
- Consiglio Nazionale delle Ricerche (CNR)
- CINECA
- Minerva AI (Sapienza University of Rome)
- Velvet AI (Almawave)
- Vitruvian-1 (ASC27)
- Istituto Italiano per l'Intelligenza Artificiale nell'Industria (AI4I)
- Istituto Italiano di Tecnologia (IIT)
- Agenzia per la Cybersicurezza Nazionale
- European High-Performance Computing Joint Undertaking
- Artificial Intelligence Act (AI Act)
