= Capo D'Orlando Prize =

Italian award

Capo d'Orlando Award
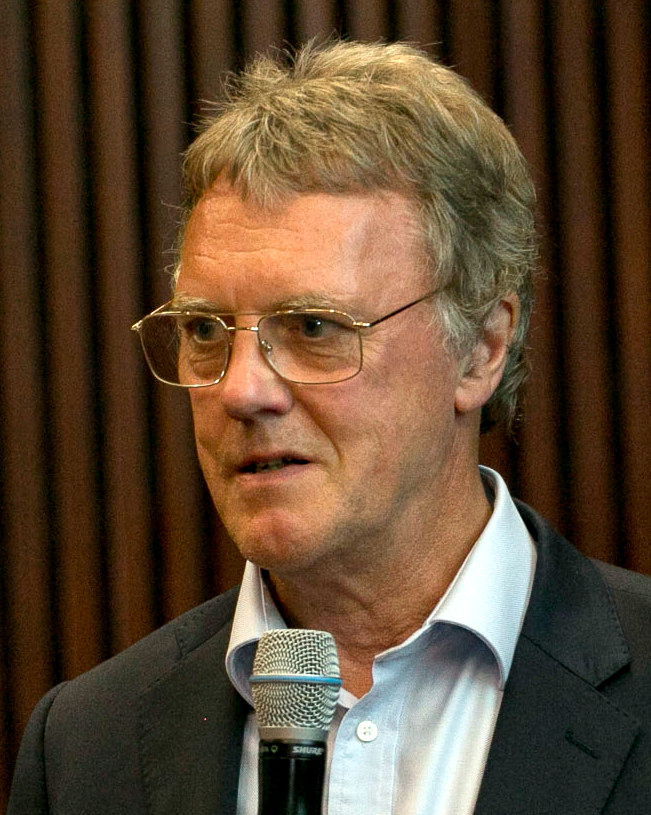
- Peter J. Ratcliffe, winner of the scientific award in 2021.
- Genre: Scientific, cultural
- Frequency: Annual
- Location: Vico Equense
- Years active: 1999 – present
- Founders: Dr. Umberto Celentano
- Website: https://www.premiocapodorlando.it

The Capo d'Orlando Prize, promoted by the Mineralogical Museum of Campania, is a recognition granted in Vico Equense since 1999 "to those who achieve outstanding results in the world of multidisciplinary research, in the field of science communication and science journalism, in museum management, and in the promotion of science through the Internet".

== History ==
The idea of the award dates back to the summer of 1998, when Dr. Umberto Celentano, director of the Mineralogical Museum of Campania, read an article in the magazine Nature about Scipionyx samniticus, a dinosaur fossil popularly known as "Ciro", discovered in Pietraroja. After gaining the support of paleontologist Philip J. Currie, Dr. Celentano proposed the establishment of the award to the Discepolo Foundation. The award symbol is a fossil fish found in Capo d'Orlando, reproduced on a silver plaque. The award's name comes from a fossil site near Vico Equense.

The scientific prize has been awarded to and collected by 18 Nobel laureates, including John F. Nash, Riccardo Giacconi, James D. Watson, Paul Krugman, Andre Geim, Venki Ramakrishnan, Paul Nurse and John Jumper.
Professor Giacconi was honorary president of the award from 2007 until his death in December 2018. Since February 2020, the honorary president has been Professor Paul Nurse, Nobel laureate in medicine.

The award ceremony is held annually, usually in May, at the historic Giusso Castle, and is divided into seven sections: science, science communication, cultural outreach, multimedia communication, cultural management, science and industry, and food science.

== Roll of honour ==
=== Science ===
- 1999 – Philip J. Currie
- 2000 – Derek Briggs
- 2001 – Giacomo Giacobini
- 2002 – Umberto Guidoni
- 2003 – John Forbes Nash
- 2004 – Christian Lefebvre
- 2005 – Riccardo Giacconi
- 2006 – Umberto Guidoni
- 2007 – Harold Kroto
- 2008 – Paul Jozef Crutzen
- 2009 – James Dewey Watson
- 2010 – Timothy Hunt
- 2011 – Paul Krugman
- 2012 – George Fitzgerald Smoot
- 2013 – Louis J. Ignarro
- 2014 – Erwin Neher
- 2015 – Andre Geim
- 2016 – Stefan W. Hell
- 2017 – Serge Haroche
- 2018 – Venki Ramakrishnan
- 2019 – Paul Nurse
- 2020 – May-Britt Moser
- 2021 – Peter J. Ratcliffe
- 2022 – Emmanuelle Charpentier
- 2023 – Svante Pääbo
- 2024 – Richard Henderson
- 2025 – John Jumper

=== Science communication ===
- 2000 – Salvatore Giannella
- 2001 – Nicoletta Salvatori
- 2002 – Paola De Paoli
- 2003 – Sandro Boeri
- 2004 – Enrico Bellone
- 2005 – Giorgio Rivieccio
- 2006 – Arrigo Petacco
- 2007 – Paola Catapano
- 2008 – Roberto Vacca
- 2009 – Giovanni Caprara
- 2010 – Enrica Battifoglia
- 2025 – Cristiano Dal Sasso

=== Cultural outreach ===
- 2001 – Paco Lanciano
- 2002 – Mario Tozzi
- 2003 – Francesco Petretti
- 2004 – Roberto Giacobbo
- 2005 – Battista Gardoncini
- 2006 – Umberto Pellizzari
- 2007 – Piergiorgio Odifreddi
- 2008 – Syusy Blady and Patrizio Roversi
- 2009 – Roberto Olla
- 2010 – Donatella Bianchi
- 2011 – Alessandro Barbero
- 2012 – Giovanni F. Bignami
- 2013 – Edoardo Boncinelli
- 2014 – Derrick de Kerckhove
- 2015 – Giovanni Carrada
- 2016 – Anna Meldolesi
- 2017 – Bruno Arpaia
- 2018 – Valerio Rossi Albertini
- 2019 – Giorgio Calabrese
- 2020 – Silvia Bencivelli
- 2021 – Francesco Vaia
- 2022 – Enrico Alleva
- 2023 – Giuseppe Remuzzi
- 2024 – Paolo Nespoli

=== Multimedia communication ===
- 2005 – Massimo Armeni
- 2006 – Massimiliano Rosolino
- 2007 – Stefano Fantoni
- 2008 – Giovanni Minoli
- 2009 – Nicola Piovani
- 2010 – Andrea Ballabio
- 2011 – Renato Parascandolo
- 2012 – Italian Space Agency
- 2013 – Barbara Gallavotti
- 2014 – Marco Cattaneo
- 2015 – Dario Bressanini
- 2016 – Mario Orfeo
- 2017 – Luca Paolizzi
- 2018 – Telmo Pievani
- 2019 – Marino Niola
- 2020 – Beatrice Mautino
- 2021 – Luigi Vicinanza
- 2022 – Gennaro Sangiuliano
- 2023 – Giorgio Manzi
- 2024 – Gianfranco Bologna
- 2025 – Roberto Navigli

=== Cultural management ===
- 2000 – Giorgio Terruzzi
- 2001 – Anna Alessandrello
- 2002 – Michele Lanzigher
- 2003 – Enrico Giusti
- 2004 – Claudia Gili
- 2005 – Massimo Capaccioli
- 2006 – Flegrea Bentivenga
- 2007 – Peter S. Cottino
- 2008 – Fiorenzo Galli
- 2009 – Marco Valle
- 2010 – Paolo Galluzzi
- 2011 – Manuela Arata
- 2012 – Alain Elkann
- 2013 – Marco Salvatore
- 2014 – Marco Cattaneo
- 2015 – Paolo Jorio
- 2016 – Evelina Christillin
- 2017 – Mauro Felicori
- 2018 – Massimo Osanna
- 2019 – Antonio Gasbarrini
- 2020 – Annamaria Calao
- 2021 – Sylvain Bellenger
- 2022 – Fabio Pagano
- 2023 – Gabriel Zuchtriegel
- 2024 – Paolo Giulierini
- 2025 – Francesco Tafuri

=== Science and industry ===
- 2011 – Giorgio Squinzi
- 2012 – Gian Pietro Beghelli
- 2013 – Andrea Illy
- 2014 – Brunello Cucinelli
- 2015 – Massimo Moschini
- 2016 – Adolfo Guzzini
- 2017 – Luigi Lazzareschi
- 2018 – Catia Bastioli
- 2019 – Alberto Bombassei
- 2020 – Sonia Bonfiglioli
- 2021 – Carmelo Giuffrè
- 2022 – Alberto Candiani
- 2023 – Carlo Pontecorvo
- 2024 – Massimo Renda
- 2025 – Giovanni Lombardi

=== Food science ===
- 2019 – Matteo Lorito
- 2020 – Elisabetta Bernardi
- 2021 – Elisabetta Moro
- 2022 – Carla Ferreri
- 2023 – Maurizio Bifulco
- 2024 – Giovanni Scapagnini
- 2025 – Sara Farnetti
