= Artificial intelligence industry in Singapore =

The artificial intelligence industry in Singapore is shaped largely by government-led strategy and funding programmes. Singapore published its first National AI Strategy in 2019, launched a second strategy (NAIS 2.0) in December 2023, and announced an update to it in May 2026.

== National strategies ==
Singapore has convened international AI safety meetings. The Singapore Consensus on Global AI Safety Research Priorities was published on 8 May 2025 following an International Scientific Exchange on AI Safety held on 26 April 2025, with over 100 contributors from 11 countries. A 2026 edition, published in July 2026 after a second exchange in May 2026, involved over 100 contributors from 13 countries and added a fourth pillar, "Societal Resilience".

=== 2019 NAIS and 2023 NAIS 2.0 ===
In a speech launching the second National AI Strategy, then Deputy Prime Minister Lawrence Wong said Singapore was among the first countries to publish a national AI strategy, in 2019.

The second strategy, launched on 4 December 2023, was refreshed after consultation with more than 300 experts and organisations. It sets a goal to more than triple the number of AI practitioners in Singapore to 15,000. The U.S. International Trade Administration describes the strategy as setting out 15 courses of action over three to five years, including raising the AI talent pool from about 4,500 to 15,000 and increasing Singapore's high-performance computing capacity.

=== National AI Council and 2026 update ===
A National AI Council, chaired by Prime Minister Lawrence Wong, was established in February 2026. Its creation was announced in the Budget 2026 speech, where Wong said it would align research and development, regulation and investment promotion.

On 20 May 2026, Minister Josephine Teo announced an update to the National AI Strategy at the ATxSummit, setting out ten refreshed priorities. These include national AI Missions, first announced at Budget 2026, in advanced manufacturing, financial services, connectivity and healthcare. The update also says Singapore committed over S$1 billion to public AI research and talent development from 2025 to 2030.

== Industry ==
The government says more than 70 companies across various sectors have chosen to establish AI Centres of Excellence in Singapore. A February 2026 report by McKinsey & Company, prepared in collaboration with the Economic Development Board, cited the AI centres of excellence of IBM, Nvidia and Oracle in Singapore, and stated that Amazon Web Services had committed an additional US$9 billion investment in Singapore by 2028.

Foreign AI developers have also opened offices in Singapore. Fortune reported in June 2026 that OpenAI and Google DeepMind had established applied AI labs in the city-state over the previous year. In September 2026, Fortune reported that OpenAI had opened its Asia headquarters in Singapore in late 2024, and that Anthropic announced it would open a Singapore office in October 2026.

=== Manus ===
The AI agent developer Manus, whose parent company Butterfly Effect was founded in China, moved its headquarters to Singapore around mid-2025. In April 2026, China's National Development and Reform Commission prohibited foreign investment in the Manus project, which blocked Meta's planned acquisition; the company later raised more than US$500 million and remained headquartered in Singapore.

=== Data centres ===
The Infocomm Media Development Authority's Green Data Centre Roadmap, published in 2024, described Singapore as a regional data centre hub with total capacity exceeding 1.4 gigawatts, and set an aim of providing at least 300 megawatts of additional capacity in the near term. On 21 August 2026, the Economic Development Board announced that it and IMDA had provisionally allocated 200 megawatts of new capacity to four data centre operators through the second Data Centre Call for Application (DC-CFA2).

== Investment by state-linked funds ==
Singapore's state investors Temasek Holdings and GIC have identified AI as an investment focus. In its Temasek Review 2026, published in July 2026, Temasek listed "accelerating AI transformation across our portfolio" among its priorities and named Anthropic and OpenAI as examples of related investments.

GIC's report on the management of the government's portfolio for 2025/26, released in July 2026, states that "one key investment focus area is artificial intelligence (AI)" and that GIC is refreshing its investment framework from 2026.

In May 2026, GIC and Temasek were reported to be among the investors in a US$65 billion funding round for the AI company Anthropic.

=== Initiatives ===
AI Singapore (AISG) was launched in May 2017. It is hosted by the National University of Singapore and Nanyang Technological University, and is a national initiative driven by the Ministry of Digital Development and Information, the Infocomm Media Development Authority and the National Research Foundation. AI Singapore developed the AI Readiness Index (AIRI), an assessment framework that organisations can use to assess their own readiness to adopt AI.

== AI readiness rankings ==
In the Oxford Insights Government AI Readiness Index 2024, published on 20 December 2024, Singapore ranked second of 188 countries with a score of 84.25, behind the United States (87.03). The index reported Singapore as the global leader in both its Government pillar (90.96, compared with 89.26 for the United States) and its Data and Infrastructure pillar (93.14, compared with 90.90).

In the 2025 edition, published in January 2026, Singapore ranked 7th of 195 countries. The two editions measure different things: the 2025 edition asks "to what extent can a government harness AI to benefit the public?", while the 2024 edition assessed readiness to implement AI in public services, so the ranks are not directly comparable.

In the International Monetary Fund's AI Preparedness Index, which the IMF publishes through its DataMapper tool, Singapore had the highest value in the 2023 data, at 0.8, ahead of Denmark (0.78) and the United States (0.77).

== See also ==
- Artificial intelligence industry in Canada
- Artificial intelligence industry in China
- Artificial intelligence industry in India
- Artificial intelligence industry in Italy
- Artificial intelligence industry in the United Kingdom
- Artificial intelligence industry in the United States
