= Artificial intelligence industry in Canada =

Artificial intelligence research and industry in Canada

The artificial intelligence industry in Canada is a rapidly expanding sector. Although Canada held a pioneering role in the early development of artificial intelligence, transforming research excellence into broad commercial adoption has proven challenging. Despite globally recognized scientific achievements and a deep pool of skilled experts, by June 2024, Canada recorded the lowest rate of AI integration among OECD countries, with only 12% of firms implementing AI in their products or services. However, AI adoption has shown significant momentum—doubling from mid-2024 to mid-2025, rising from 6.1% to 12.2%. As of September 2025, Statistics Canada indicated that while about one-third of Canadian businesses had no plans to adopt artificial intelligence in the next year, 14.5% reported intentions to begin using AI for producing goods or delivering services. The primary reasons for not moving forward with AI were lack of relevance, insufficient knowledge, and privacy concerns. According to Public Works Canada (PwC), the pace of AI adoption in Canada is roughly three-quarters of the United States rate, highlighting a notable gap between the two countries in business integration of this technology. British-Canadian computer scientist Geoffrey Hinton stated in 2025 that Canadian companies are adopting artificial intelligence at a slower pace, which may result in the loss of the country's early advantages in the field. In the 2026 Global Index on Responsible AI, Canada scored 55.09. It was ranked 25th of 135 countries and ahead of 82% of those assessed, 0.9 points above the Northern America average (54.2) and 3.0 points above the high-income average (52.1).

At the "All In AI" conference held in Montreal in September 2025, the Minister of Artificial Intelligence and Digital Innovation Evan Solomon, described "Building digital sovereignty" as the most pressing democratic issue of the time. He introduced a 26-person task force focused on updating Canada's AI strategy.

In their 2024 report " "Learning Together for Responsible Artificial Intelligence" report, the Innovation, Science, and Economic Development Canada stressed that public awareness, trust, and AI literacy are essential for the responsible adoption and governance of AI in Canada. Montreal workshops in 2021 expanded the OECD's 2019 definition of AI as "the set of computer techniques that enable a machine (e.g., a computer or telephone) to perform tasks that typically require intelligence, such as reasoning or learning. It is also referred to as the automation of intelligent tasks. Scientific developments in AI, such as deep-learning techniques, have made it possible to design access to huge amounts of data and ever-increasing computing power. These new techniques have been rapidly deployed on a large scale in all areas of social life, in transport, education, culture and health."

== Federal investments and policy ==
The 2025 federal budget allocates over $1 billion over the next five years to bolster Canada's artificial intelligence and quantum computing ecosystem.

== Industry landscape or research hubs ==
AlexNet, an influential deep convolutional neural network developed at the University of Toronto by Alex Krizhevsky, Ilya Sutskever, and Geoffrey Hinton, marked a pivotal turning point in modern artificial intelligence. In 2012, it achieved a dramatic reduction in error rates for the ImageNet Large Scale Visual Recognition Challenge (ILSVRC), showcasing the practical power of deep learning and GPU acceleration. The success of AlexNet helped cement Canada’s reputation for AI leadership and inspired rapid adoption of deep learning across the technology sector, with ongoing impact in both academic and commercial domains. In healthcare, AlexNet has been adapted for medical imaging to assist with analyzing radiographs, mammograms, and other scans, including identifying abnormalities and supporting clinical diagnosis.

In 2015, the Ottawa-based start-up Advanced Symbolics Inc. (ASI) began developing Polly, an artificial intelligence system designed to analyze and anticipate how target audiences behave—enabling more effective communication strategies and advertising campaigns. Polly was named after its first assignment analyzing the politics of Brexit. The AI gained widespread attention in 2016 for accurately forecasting both the Brexit referendum and the 2016 U.S. presidential election won by Donald Trump. The company states that Polly is used by organizations in diverse sectors—including healthcare, politics, entertainment, and mental health research—to support decision-making based on predictive analytics.

Chartwatch, an AI tool developed in Canada, has been shown to reduce unexpected hospital deaths by 26% according to a 2024 study. The system analyzes patient data to detect subtle signs of deterioration, supporting healthcare teams in providing timely interventions.

=== Notable figures in AI in Canada ===
Geoffrey Hinton's decades-long work eventually formed the foundation of artificial intelligence, which earned him the Nobel Prize for physics in 2024.

Yoshua Bengio, who won the Turing Award in 2018 for his pioneering work in deep learning, founded what would become Mila in 1993. Mila, is currently a collaboration between four Montreal-based academic partners.—the Pan-Canadian Artificial Intelligence Strategy includes Alberta's Amii, Toronto's Vector Institute, and Mila.

Fakhreddine Karray's work on operational AI has had tangible impact across several Canadian-relevant sectors, notably intelligent transportation systems, virtual healthcare, and driver safety.

=== AI in the oil and gas industry ===
According to a 2020 Ernst & Young report the oil and gas industry in Canada is using AI in automating routine, repetitive, and dangerous tasks with technologies like robotic process automation and machine learning; optimizing production and processing; enhancing transportation logistics; improving equipment operation and monitoring; and enabling preventative maintenance. AI is also deployed for data analysis to improve prediction and decision-making, and is expected to automate up to 50% of job competencies in upstream oil and gas by 2040. Oilsands giant Suncor Energy operates a large fleet of autonomous trucks and has started using AI in its dispatch system at the Mildred Lake mine. As of 2024, AI manages routine tasks such as allocating trucks to dump stations and sending them to refuelling locations.

=== Indigenous and Inuit Innovation in AI ===
Indigenous organizations have been working on the creation of new technologies for language revitalization in partnership with National Research Council of Canada since the mid-2010s. In 2025, Inuit researchers and technology partners launched an AI-powered initiative to support the revitalization and preservation of Inuktitut, demonstrating how artificial intelligence can be adapted for Indigenous language and cultural priorities. A 2025 CBC article notes that, while AI can help revitalize Inuktitut, Inuit leaders emphasize concerns about data sovereignty, information ownership, and the need for Indigenous leadership to ensure transparency, privacy, and accountability in AI development.

== Regulation ==
Canada's Artificial Intelligence and Data Act (AIDA) was proposed in November 2022, as part of the Digital Charter Implementation Act (Bill C-27). As well voluntary codes, such as the September 2023 Code of Conduct for Generative AI, and landmark investments in advanced computing infrastructure and the Canadian Artificial Intelligence Safety Institute (CAISI) reflect Canada's commitment to both safety and global competitiveness.

== AI infrastructure ==
Canada has undertaken efforts to expand its AI computing infrastructure at both provincial and federal levels. The federal government's Canadian Sovereign AI Compute Strategy, allocated up to C$2 billion in Budget 2024, aims to enhance computing capacity to support domestic AI industry growth and AI adoption across the economy, with up to C$700 million designated to mobilize private sector investment in new or expanded data centres. Alberta has introduced an AI Data Centres Strategy to position itself as a leading North American destination for data centre investment, targeting C$100 billion worth of AI data centres under development by 2030. One major project under Alberta's strategy is the Wonder Valley AI Data Centre Park near Grande Prairie, which was exempted from provincial environmental impact assessment in April 2026 but still requires permits demonstrating safe construction and operation.

According to Statista, as of April 2026, Canada has 287 data centres.

== AI and data sovereignty ==
AI and data sovereignty in Canada refers to efforts to ensure that the development, deployment and use of artificial intelligence systems remain subject to Canadian jurisdiction, values and democratic control, particularly with respect to critical computing infrastructure and the handling of data. The federal government's Canadian Sovereign AI Compute Strategy defines sovereign AI compute as Canadian-owned and Canadian-located infrastructure providing domestic researchers, businesses and the public sector with secure access to advanced computing, while safeguarding Canadian data and intellectual property and reducing reliance on foreign providers.

Policy and legal commentary use the term "AI sovereignty" to describe maintaining strategic control across the AI stack—from data centres and cloud infrastructure to machine learning models and applications—as a goal distinct from full technological self-sufficiency. Data sovereignty debates address whether personal and sensitive information generated in Canada should be stored, processed and governed under Canadian law, with legal analyses highlighting tensions between cross-border data flows, cloud outsourcing and emerging requirements for domestic control over datasets used to train AI systems. A 2026 Munk School report identified vulnerabilities in Canada's AI sovereignty position and set out strategic options for domestic compute capacity.

== See also ==
- Artificial intelligence industry in China
- Artificial intelligence industry in Italy
- Artificial intelligence industry in the United Kingdom
