= 2025 arson attacks against Keir Starmer =

In May 2025 several arson attacks occurred against property in north London linked to Keir Starmer, the Prime Minister of the United Kingdom. Two men were found guilty of the attacks and a third was acquitted. The attacks were linked to Direct Action UK, a purported British far-right group that investigations by the Financial Times and BBC News reported was operated from Russia as part of a wider effort to recruit local proxies and inflame social tensions in the UK.

== Attacks ==
On 8 May 2025 a Toyota vehicle that had previously been owned by Starmer was set on fire in a street in Kentish Town in north London where Starmer had previously lived. Three days later, a fire occurred at flats in Islington where Starmer had also lived in the past. The third attack occurred the next day, on 12 May, when the front door of a house owned by Starmer in Kentish Town was set alight. Starmer's sister-in-law was living in the property and was at home when the fire occurred.

The attacks were coordinated by an individual using the online alias "EL", or "El Money", who worked as the handler for the three men eventually arrested for the attacks. EL recruited a Ukrainian national, Roman Lavrynovych, on the messaging app Telegram after encountering him on a group for Ukrainians who were seeking work in London. EL offered Lavrynovych Russian citizenship in exchange for conducting the attacks. EL's contact details were saved in Lavrynovych's mobile phone as "EL Money". EL told Lavrynovych to put up posters for a far-right activist group, Direct Action UK, and promised him thousands of pounds in payment, which he never received. Lavrynovych told the court that he carried out the attacks for financial reasons. On 12 May, after the third attack, EL told Lavrynovych to throw away his clothes and that "there is news, you'll get crypto" and "Look, you attacked the home of a very high-ranking person in Britain. I'll send you money, you need to leave the city". Lavrynovych was subsequently arrested on 12 May.

=== Suspects and trial ===
Three defendants faced trial over the attacks: a Ukrainian national Roman Lavrynovych, a Ukrainian-born Romanian national Stanislav Carpiuc, and Petro Pochynok. They had denied conspiring together or with others to damage property by fire between 1 April and 13 May 2025. The three men all lived in London. On 15 June 2026, after a trial at the Old Bailey, Lavrynovych and Carpiuc were found guilty of conspiring to carry out the attacks.

Lavrynovych was convicted of the count of damaging property by fire being reckless as to whether life was endangered on 11 and 12 May at two north London properties but was acquitted of damaging property by fire with intent to endanger life at the fires. Pochynok was found not guilty of conspiracy to commit arson.

Commander Helen Flanagan, the head of Counter Terrorism Command, said there was no evidence to suggest that the defendants were aware of the identity of their target or that the properties were linked to Starmer and that there they had "no ideological motivation". She said that "clearly the intention from the online tasker was to create fear, both for the victim and the prime minister, and cause uncertainty, unrest, for the UK".

Following the fire it was falsely alleged that the Ukrainian suspects were male sex workers and it was implied that Starmer was involved in a sex scandal with them. The rumour was amplified by far-right figures such as Tommy Robinson, as well as other fringe political figures such as George Galloway, spreading to X, YouTube, TikTok, and protest marches (with placards referencing it). Robinson's message on X was reposted by Kirill Dmitriev, a special envoy to President Putin. Research by the Institute for Strategic Dialogue Center for Countering Digital Hate described the theory as a classic case of Russian disinformation by creating or amplifying a scandal (combining elements of homophobia, anti-establishment sentiment and geopolitical provocation) and using this to portray moral decadence, often by monitoring and boosting far-right content.

=== Russian links and identity of EL ===
In May 2025, the Financial Times reported that British security officials were investigating possible Russian involvement in the attacks, including whether actors in Russia had recruited the men accused of carrying them out.

Following the trial in June 2026, the Financial Times reported that its investigation had established that the handler known as "El Money" was located in Russia and closely aligned with Noname057(16), a pro-Kremlin hacktivist group, and that Direct Action was administered by people in Russia. A BBC News investigation published the same day said it had identified evidence suggesting that "EL" was Evgeny Lyukshin (born c. 2003), a 23-year-old Russian diplomat and son of a senior Russian official. The BBC said that it could not establish with certainty that Lyukshin was EL, while counter-terrorism police said that they had also been unable to prove EL's identity or whom he was working for.

The Russian Embassy in London said in a statement that it "reject[ed] any attempt to associate Russia or its foreign ministry with unlawful activities" and that Russia posed "no threat to the United Kingdom or its people and harbours no aggressive intentions towards Britain".

== Direct Action UK ==
Direct Action UK presented itself as a British far-right group. Investigations by the Financial Times and BBC News reported that it was operated from Russia and was used to promote anti-Muslim and anti-immigration material, recruit people in the UK for acts of vandalism and other offences, and inflame social divisions. Hope Not Hate and Tell MAMA had separately concluded that the group appeared to be a Russian operation and reported their concerns to counter-terrorism police.

Hope Not Hate reported Direct Action to counter-terror police in February 2026 after believing that Russian operatives were in charge of the group and were planning to recruit British residents to launch a "terror attack against a mosque or identifiably Muslim target in the UK". Hope Not Hate had no response from their report to the police. Tell MAMA received an acknowledgment from police but no further communication.

== Reaction ==
At Prime Minister's Questions on 14 May 2025, a few days after the fire at his Kentish Town property, Starmer described the attacks as "an attack on all of us, on democracy and the values that we stand for". He was supported by Kemi Badenoch, the Leader of the Opposition, and Ed Davey, the Leader of the Liberal Democrats, who both echoed Starmer's statement of condemnation.
