= 2021 Democratic Party (Italy) leadership by-election =

Itakian internal party election with consequences for immigration policy

2021 Democratic Party leadership by-election
- 14 March 2021
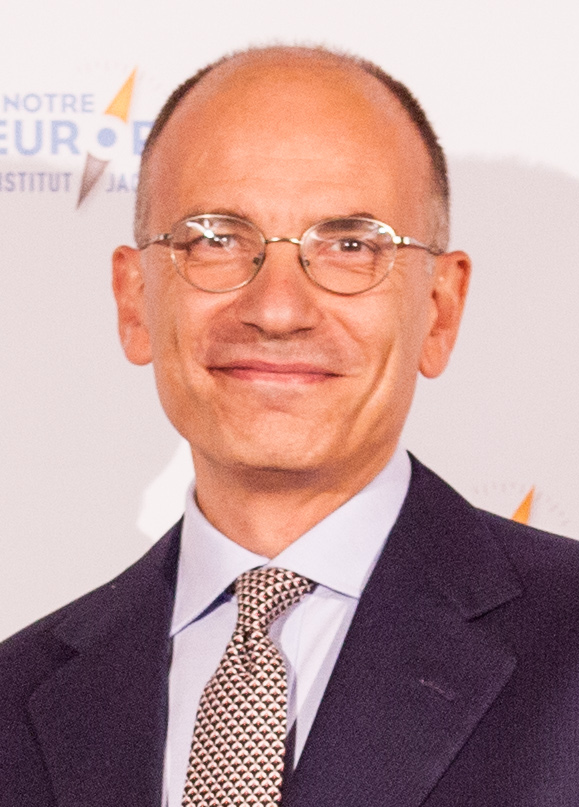
Candidate	Enrico Letta
Delegates' ballot	860
Percentage	99.3%
Secretary before election
Nicola Zingaretti
Elected Secretary
Enrico Letta

The 2021 Democratic Party leadership by-election was an election held on 14 March 2021 in which the members of the Democratic Party's National Assembly elected the party Secretary, whose seat had been vacant since 4 March of the same year.

== Procedure ==
Under the internal rules of the Democratic Party, if an incumbent Secretary resigns, the National Assembly can either decide to dissolve itself and call a new primary election, or choose a new Secretary who will serve until the expiration of the Assembly's four years term.

== Candidates ==
Portrait	Name	Offices held
	Enrico Letta (age 59)	Prime Minister of Italy (2013–2014) Other positions: Member of the Chamber of Deputies (2001–2015; 2021–present); Deputy secretary of the Democratic Party (2009–2013); Secretary of the Council of Ministers (2006–2008) Member of the European Parliament (2004–2006); Minister for the Community Policies (1998–1999) Deputy secretary of the Italian People's Party (1997–1998); Minister of Industry, Commerce and Crafts (1996–1998)

== History ==
The 2019 Democratic Party leadership election had been won by Nicola Zingaretti, who had become Secretary after winning over 66% of the vote. On 4 March 2021, Zingaretti resigned, planning to hand the party's leadership to former Prime Minister Enrico Letta. Letta, who at the time was working in Paris as a university professor, immediately returned to Italy, where he was elected Secretary by the National Assembly in a nearly unanimous vote. In his first speech as leader of the Democratic Party, he set out his agenda, which included the formation a broad alliance alongside centre-left and centrist political forces, making it easier for children of immigrants to obtain Italian citizenship, lowering the minimum voting age from 18 to 16, the introduction of an anti-defection law, and an electoral law reform.

== Results ==
=== National Assembly of the Democratic Party ===
Motion to elect Enrico Letta Secretary of the Democratic Party, 14 March 2021
Ballot →
In favor	860 / 866 (99%)
Against	2 / 866 (0.2%)
Abstentions	4 / 866 (0.5%)
