= Angela Maria Guidi Cingolani =

Italian politician (1896–1991)

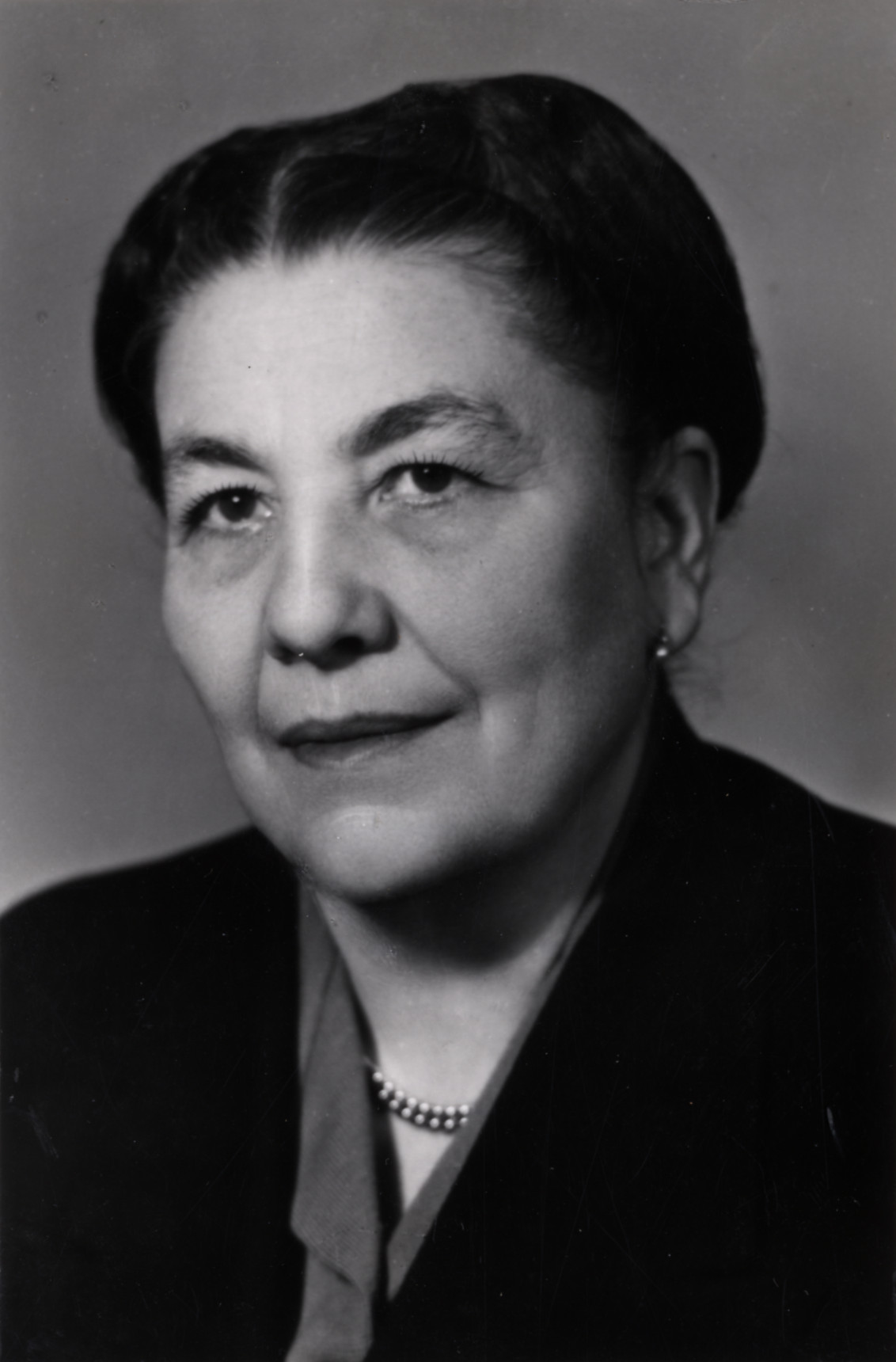
- Official portrait, 1948

Member of the Constituent Assembly
- In office 25 January 1946 – 31 January 1948
- Constituency: Liguria

Member of the Chamber of Deputies
- In office 8 May 1948 – 24 June 1953
- Constituency: Rome

Undersecretary to the Ministry of Industry and Commerce
- In office 27 July 1951 – 16 July 1953
- Prime Minister: Alcide De Gasperi

Mayor of Palestrina
- In office 1954–1965

Personal details
- Born: Angela Maria Guidi; 31 October 1896 Rome, Kingdom of Italy
- Died: 11 August 1991 (aged 94) Rome, Italy
- Party: Christian Democracy
- Spouse: Mario Cingolani (m. 1935; died 1971)
- Children: 1
- Education: University of Naples "L'Orientale"
- Profession: Office clerk

Angela Maria Guidi Cingolani (née Guidi; 31 October 1896 – 11 August 1991) was an Italian politician. A member of the Christian Democracy, she was part of the Constituent Assembly of Italy and later became a member of the Chamber of Deputies.

== Life ==
A native of Rome, Guidi Cingolani was a member of the Popular Party and the Young Women of Catholic Action. She graduated from the University of Naples "L'Orientale" in Slavic languages and literatures.

In 1948, following the fall of the Fascists from power, she was elected to the Constituent Assembly of Italy with a number of other women.

Between 1951 and 1953 she was the first Italian woman to be Undersecretary to the Ministry of Industry and Commerce. She was later elected mayor of the municipality of Palestrina.
