= Italian Institute of Artificial Intelligence for Industry =

Italian research institute

The Italian Institute of Artificial Intelligence - AI4I
- Abbreviation: AI4I
- Type: Governmental organisation
- Headquarters: Turin, Italy
- Location: Corso Castelfidardo n. 22, 10129 Turin
- Coordinates: 45°4′0.46″N 7°39′34.66″E
- Fields: Artificial intelligence
- Official language: English, Italian
- President: Fabio Pammolli
- Director: Antonio Calegari
- Budget: ~ € 20 million per year
- Website: ai4i.it

The Italian Institute of Artificial Intelligence - AI4I (Italian: Istituto Italiano per l'Intelligenza Artificiale) is an Italian research institute established by the Italian Government based in Turin, Italy. Its primary mission is to conduct transformative, application-oriented research in artificial intelligence (AI), aiming to drive innovation, industrial transformation, and economic growth. AI4I focuses on integrating AI into various industrial processes, products, and services, with a particular emphasis on sectors like manufacturing, aerospace, and automotive. The institute supports young researchers and startups by providing competitive pay, access to high-performance computing resources, state-of-the-art laboratories, and industrial collaborations.

== History ==
The idea of establishing a national Italian institute for artificial intelligence based in Turin was launched by Father Luca Peyron in July 2020. Embraced by local stakeholders, after a parliamentary process and the succession of several governments, it became a reality in 2024. On May 3, 2024, the “Ai4Industry” Foundation was presented at the Museo del Risorgimento in Turin by ministers Giancarlo Giorgetti, Adolfo Urso and Anna Maria Bernini, the president of the Piedmont Region Alberto Cirio, and the mayor of Turin Stefano Lo Russo. On May 5, 2024, the Institute was founded in Turin with the contribution of the Ministry of Economy and Finance, the Ministry for Business and Made in Italy and the Ministry of University and Research.
On October 5, 2024, the Institute made its headquarters in the OGR, the former Officine Grandi Riparazioni, an innovation hub that already hosts companies and startups and that fosters scientific and technological synergies. On December 11, 2024, Antonio Calegari was appointed Director of the institute. Furthermore, partnership agreements are defined with Fondazione CRT (Cassa di Risparmio di Torino) and OGR (Officine Grandi Riparazioni). On 11 December 2024, the Institute was included in the European High-Performance Computing Joint Undertaking initiative for the construction of new AI Factories. The institute, considered a strategic asset by Italy and the European Union, will be the main recipient in Italy of the funds of the European initiative InvestAI.

== See also ==
- Turin
- University of Turin
- Polytechnic of Turin
- CINECA
- Minerva AI (Sapienza University of Rome)
- Velvet AI (Almawave)
- Istituto Italiano di Tecnologia (IIT)
- Agenzia per la Cybersicurezza Nazionale
- European High-Performance Computing Joint Undertaking
