= Francesca Caon =

Italian journalist and public relations consultant

- Born: 29 December 1979 (age 46); Padua, Italy
- Occupations: Journalist; public relations consultant; author
- Years active: 2004–present
- Known for: Founder of CAON Public Relations; editorial director of Luxury People
- Notable work: I dieci comandamenti delle PR (2021); Ombrelli per shitstorm (2026)

Francesca Caon (born 29 December 1979) is an Italian journalist, public relations consultant and author. She founded the public relations agency CAON Public Relations and is the editorial director of the magazine Luxury People. Her books include I dieci comandamenti delle PR (2021), on public relations, and Ombrelli per shitstorm (2026), on online reputational crises.

== Biography ==
Caon was born in Padua, Italy. She graduated from the Accademia Teatrale Carlo Goldoni, associated with the Teatro Stabile del Veneto, in 2004.

She subsequently moved to Rome and worked in television, including on RAI programmes such as Ragazzi c'è Voyager, presented by Roberto Giacobbo, and Unomattina Estate. She also worked with record labels.

Caon later moved to Valencia, Spain, where she worked for a Spanish aerial firefighting company, handling relations with government bodies and European civil protection agencies.

In 2016 and 2017, she organised editions of the Sabaudia Film Festival in Sabaudia, whose artistic directors during those years were Simona Izzo and Ricky Tognazzi.

Caon established her public relations business in 2017. In April 2023, she became a member of the Federazione Relazioni Pubbliche Italiana (FERPI), the Italian association of public relations professionals. In June of that year, her agency joined UNA – Aziende della Comunicazione Unite, an Italian association of communications agencies.

in January 2021, Caon published her first book, I dieci comandamenti delle PR about principles for public relations.

Caon is the editorial director of Luxury People. In 2025, she was included in StartupItalia's Unstoppable Women project, which features women working in business, research and other professional fields.

In June 2026, The second Caon's books was published by ROI Edizioni under the title Ombrelli per shitstorm. Come difendersi dalle crisi reputazionali. The book examines online shitstorms and reputational crises through Italian examples, including the cases of Enzo Tortora, Mia Martini, Chiara Ferragni, Jannik Sinner, Ilary Blasi, Måneskin, and the duo Bugo and Morgan.

Caon has published articles in HuffPost Italia, including commentary on current affairs, social media, public figures and reputational crises. Her other publications include Linkiesta, Fortune Italia, MOW, AI News and Agenda Digitale. She has also published a contributed article on public relations through Econopoly, the blog platform of Il Sole 24 Ore.

== Bibliography ==
- Caon, Francesca (2021). I dieci comandamenti delle PR (in Italian). Milan: ROI Edizioni. ISBN 978-88-362-0039-9.
- Caon, Francesca (2026). Ombrelli per shitstorm. Come difendersi dalle crisi reputazionali (in Italian). Milan: ROI Edizioni. ISBN 978-88-362-0324-6.
