= Gun control in Italy =

Gun control in Italy encompasses the political and regulatory landscape of firearm ownership and usage within the country, operating under the framework of the European Union's Firearms Directive. (Note: The English words 'politics' and 'policy' are both translated by the single Italian word 'politica': discussion of this topic with an Italian speaker should recognize that for the Italian there is no automatic distinction between 'politics' and 'policy'.) Italian national police authorities issue various types of gun licenses. A 2007 study by the Small Arms Survey Project estimated Italy's per capita gun ownership rate at approximately 12%, with around 7 million registered firearms in civilian circulation.

== Licensing and acquisition ==
To legally acquire firearms in Italy, individuals must obtain a "purchase authorization" (nulla osta all'acquisto). This authorization permits the holder to purchase and possess a firearm, but not to carry or use it. The same nulla osta is required to inherit firearms; however, in inheritance cases, this license is typically temporary and specifically for transporting the firearms from the deceased's residence to a new location. This temporary authorization is valid for 30 days and restricted to the necessary route for relocating the firearms, either from the previous location to the new one, or from a gun shop to the intended place of storage. It does not authorize firearm usage or carrying outside of this specific transport. Following acquisition, registration of "weapon detention" is mandatory within 72 hours at the nearest police station.

Separate firearm carry licenses, known as porto d'armi in Italian, are required to carry firearms outside of one's residence or to transport them for purposes beyond initial acquisition. These licenses are issued for specific reasons, including hunting, sport shooting, personal defense, or professional security duties.

Eligibility for any firearm license mandates applicants to be at least 18 years of age, demonstrate safe firearm handling proficiency (typically through a certificate from a recognized shooting range following a practical course), possess a clean criminal record (verified by police authorities), and not suffer from mental illness or have a history of alcohol or illegal drug abuse. Further grounds for license denial include being a conscientious objector or cohabiting with individuals who might improperly access and misuse firearms (e.g., family members with mental illness, substance abuse issues, or criminal records).

The Questura, the provincial office of the national police, is the agency responsible for managing, authorizing, and overseeing firearm possession. Applications can be submitted directly to the Questura or via local Carabinieri stations. The Questura's "Ufficio Armi" (Firearms Office) processes and reviews all related documentation.

== National Firearms Catalogue ==
Italian law formerly required all rifled-barrel firearms manufactured or imported after 1976 to be registered in a national catalogue and assigned a progressive number. This was overseen by a commission comprising government officials and representatives from the Italian arms industry. The commission's role was to classify rifled firearms as either "war firearms" (arma da guerra) or "common firearms" (arma comune da sparo). The catalogue detailed the weapon's characteristics, such as barrel and overall length, magazine capacity, and other technical specifications, which could not be legally altered without commission re-evaluation. "Common firearms" with specific features (sights, action type) could be further designated as "sporting firearms" (armi sportive). Sporting firearms could be used for self-defence as a last resort, for example, during a home invasion, but could not be carried for self-defense.

The National Firearms Catalogue and its associated commission were abolished in 2012 under economic stability legislation enacted on 12 November 2011. The Banco Nazionale di Prova replaced it, taking over the assessment of firearms for import approval and maintaining an electronic registry of characteristics for approved firearms, including type (long or short), European firearm category, manufacturer, and magazine capacity.

== Firearms and ammunition possession limits ==
All privately held firearms must be registered with the local police department within 72 hours of acquisition or transfer, commencing from the time the firearm is physically taken into possession. For instance, if a firearm is purchased but collected from the retailer a week later, the 72-hour period begins upon collection.

Italian law sets limits on the number and types of firearms civilians can possess:

Up to three "common firearms": This category typically includes non-sporting handguns, but can also encompass any firearm not chambered for hunting calibers, such as 10-gauge shotguns or certain .22 rimfire pistols and rifles.

Up to twelve "sporting weapons": Firearms specifically classified for shooting sports by the National Proof House fall into this category.

Unlimited hunting weapons: Both rifles and shotguns intended for hunting are unlimited in quantity.

Up to eight antique or historical weapons: Firearms manufactured before 1890 are classified as antique or historical.

Unlimited muzzle-loading replicas: Single-shot muzzleloader replicas do not require registration.

Unlimited low-power airguns: Airguns with a muzzle energy of 7.5 Joules or less, specifically approved by the Ministry of Interior, are exempt from registration.

Ammunition possession is also regulated. Licensed individuals may possess up to 200 rounds of handgun ammunition and 1,500 rounds of rifle or shotgun ammunition. Competition shooters may obtain a special license allowing possession of up to 1,500 handgun rounds and the ability to carry up to 600 rounds during competitions. Every ammunition purchase that is not a replenishment (reintegro) of previously registered quantities must be registered within 72 hours. Registration is only required for rifle ammunition when quantities exceed 1,000 rounds. Replenishment refers to purchasing or reloading ammunition up to or below the previously registered quantity after use, in which case re-registration is not necessary.

The trade and possession of deactivated and replica (non-firing) firearms are unrestricted, provided each deactivated firearm is accompanied by a deactivation certificate compliant with Italian law.

=== Firearm collector's license ===
A Firearm Collector's License allows the holder to possess an unlimited number of firearms at home. However, these firearms typically cannot be used or transported, and ammunition for them cannot be purchased. Local police departments may mandate secure storage, such as a safe room, if the collection is extensive. Specific regulations may vary based on local police policy.

== Police firearm regulations ==
National police officers are authorized to carry their service handguns at all times, without geographical or time limitations, but must carry them concealed when off duty. Submachine guns can only be carried while on duty. Local police officers are generally permitted to carry their handguns (concealed when off duty) but only within their respective jurisdictions. Firearms used by police forces are usually government property, either national or local. National Police officers are typically assigned a service pistol indefinitely, while assignment durations for Local Police officers can vary according to local regulations.

Security guards, upon request and prefectoral authorization, may be permitted to carry firearms while on duty without territorial restrictions. This authorization is commonly granted to cash-in-transit security personnel and private security officers guarding banks, shopping centers, hospitals, and other public facilities.

== Restrictions in public places ==
Carrying weapons in public places in Italy is generally prohibited, with the following legal exceptions:

=== Hunting license ===
A hunting license, coupled with a regional hunting permit from the license holder's region of residence, authorizes the carrying of hunting weapons only during the hunting season and within designated game reserves. When transporting hunting weapons outside of game reserves, they must be unloaded and secured in a case.

Permitted firearms for hunting include:

Smoothbore shotguns of 12-gauge or smaller, with an overall length exceeding 60 cm and a barrel length over 30 cm.

Rifled firearms firing bullets with a diameter exceeding 5.6mm or a case length over 40mm, with an overall length over 60 cm and a barrel length exceeding 30 cm.

=== Sport shooting license ===
A sport shooting license allows individuals to transport firearms (unloaded and in a case) from their residence to authorized shooting ranges or other safe locations for practice. Private shooting locations must be reasonably far from public roads and populated areas and inaccessible to unauthorized individuals. Like other firearm licenses, the sport shooting license is valid nationally, enabling transportation of firearms throughout Italy, although firearms can only be used at designated locations and must not be left unattended during transport.

=== Concealed carry license ===
A concealed carry license permits citizens to carry a handgun for personal defense. This license is significantly more difficult to obtain than hunting or sport shooting licenses, requires annual renewal (compared to the 5-year validity of other licenses), and applicants must demonstrate a valid reason for concealed carry (e.g., individuals who transport valuables such as jewelry). A specialized carry license is issued to private security personnel, with renewal required every two years and a reduced issuance tax. Open carry of handguns is not explicitly prohibited by law but is de facto only permitted for on-duty security personnel. Prefects and Magistrates are authorized to purchase and carry firearms for self-defense without needing to obtain a concealed carry license.

== General weapons restrictions ==
Italian law categorizes weapons into "proper" and "improper" weapons, with "proper weapons" further divided into "bladed weapons" and "firearms," imposing restrictions based on weapon type, caliber, magazine capacity, intended purpose, and location.

Improper weapons are objects not designed as weapons but capable of being used as such. Carrying improper weapons in public places, particularly sensitive locations like hospitals, stadiums, public events, and squares, is prohibited. This category includes pointed or bladed tools (e.g., screwdrivers, kitchen knives), baseball bats, and golf clubs. The legal offense is termed "unjustified carrying of an improper weapon" (Porto abusivo di arma impropria). The Supreme Court of Cassation has extended these regulations to machetes (considered agricultural tools), scuba knives (deemed sporting equipment), and various types of knives, with differentiation based on intended use, purpose, and resemblance to daggers (e.g., double-edged blades).

Proper weapons are heavily regulated and restricted, encompassing both bladed and firearms.

Bladed weapons are regulated based on their intended use and are classified as either "subject to declaration" or "not subject to declaration." The former category includes sharpened weapons (swords, daggers, sabers, battle axes, etc.) that cannot be removed from the owner's residence once possessed. The latter category includes unsharpened versions of the same weapons intended for collection, ceremonial purposes, and similar uses.

Firearms are subject to tiered regulations and limitations regarding quantity and permitted uses. Italian firearms laws impose restrictions on firearm types, calibers, and magazine capacities accessible to civilians.

Category A – Prohibited Firearms includes military explosive weapons, automatic firearms, firearms disguised as other objects, explosive or incendiary projectiles, including ammunition, expanding bullets, and automatic weapons converted to semi-automatic operation. Further restrictions apply to magazine capacity and other technical specifications. This category also encompasses full-automatic and select-fire firearms (machine guns), grenade launchers, suppressors, destructive devices, and other military weapons and ammunition, as well as semi-automatic pistols in military calibers.

Category B – Authorization Required Firearms includes various types of semi-automatic firearms with restricted magazine capacities or other specific features, as well as single-shot rifles and shotguns.

Category C – Declaration Required Firearms includes semi-automatic rifles, single-shot or multi-shot long rifles, and other firearms with characteristics differing from Category B firearms.

Note: Categories B and C have virtually identical possession and authorization requirements, as all non-prohibited firearms require a license.

Suppressors are restricted for civilian use; their import and manufacture have been prohibited since 2010, but previously acquired suppressors may be possessed with mandatory declaration. 5.56×45mm NATO caliber firearms are prohibited, while .223 Remington caliber are permitted; 7.62×51mm NATO caliber firearms are prohibited, while .308 Winchester caliber are permitted. Magazines themselves are not subject to tracking or mandatory declaration unless they exceed 20 rounds for pistols or 10 rounds for rifles, in which case declaration to authorities is required. Specific regulations limit the quantities of ammunition and firearms that may be possessed. Italian regulations also extend to airguns, imposing limitations, requirements, and licensing for possession and carry, specifically for airguns exceeding 7.5 Joules of muzzle energy, which are classified as firearms.

== See also ==
List of countries by gun ownership
