= Mineralogical Museum of Campania =

Museum in Italy

Coordinates: 40.6628°N 14.4246°E

The Campanian Mineralogical Museum (Italian: Museo Mineralogico Campano) is a natural history museum in Vico Equense, Campania, Italy. It opened on 22 October 1992 and is housed in the former convent of the Santissima Trinità e Paradiso.

The museum displays more than 3,500 minerals representing 1,400 species from around the world. Its collections also include fossils, gemstones, meteorites, shells and prehistoric stone tools. A palaeontological section was added in 1997, followed by an anthropological section in 2003.

The museum promotes the Capo d'Orlando Prize, an annual scientific and cultural award established in 1999.
