= Banco Nazionale di Prova =

Italian public agency for firearms testing

- Banco nazionale di prova per le armi da fuoco portatili e per le munizioni commerciali

Public body overview
- Formed: January 13, 1910; 116 years ago
- Jurisdiction: Government of Italy
- Headquarters: Gardone Val Trompia
- Website: www.bancoprova.it

The Banco Nazionale di Prova (official denomination: Banco nazionale di prova per le armi da fuoco portatili e per le munizioni commerciali) is an Italian public body responsible for verifying the compliance of firearms and ammunition to be marketed in the Italian market.

== History ==
Although there were precedents in the pre-unification Italian states, the institution was formally established by the Royal Decree No. 20 of January 13, 1910. Despite its official establishment, it began its activity only in 1920, in the laboratories of Gardone Val Trompia and Brescia. Its importance grew also because weapons testing became mandatory, as sanctioned by the Royal Decree-Law No. 3152 of December 30, 1923. Its current headquarters were inaugurated in 1951. In 1997, a branch was opened inside the Benelli Armi company headquarters.

== Responsibilities ==
Following the abolition of the National Catalogue of Common Firearms in 2012, the Banco Nazionale di Prova is responsible for verifying technical and regulatory requirements. The list of approved weapons can be consulted by accessing the institutional website. A decree in 2013 established that sporting firearms can be recognized as such, upon request of the manufacturer or importer, after consulting the relevant sports federations affiliated or associated with Italian National Olympic Committee (CONI).

== Legal References ==
- Royal Decree No. 20 of January 13, 1910 (in Italian)
- Royal Decree-Law No. 3152 of December 30, 1923
- Law No. 124 of August 4, 2017 (art. 1, paragraph 174) (in Italian)
- Decree of the President of the Republic No. 193 of November 24, 2020 - Regulation for the reorganization of the National Proof House for Portable Firearms and Commercial Ammunition, implementing Article 1, paragraph 174, of Law No. 124 of August 4, 2017. (in Italian)

== See also ==
Gun control in Italy
