= Renato Parascandolo =

Renato Parascandolo (born 26 September 1945 in Naples) is a journalist, essayist and lecturer, as well as a manager of the public Italian television.

== Career ==
Parascandolo was the general editor of the cultural programs of the Italian television (RAI Educational) from 1998 to 2002. From 2007 to 2011 he served as head of the division responsible for safeguarding the intellectual property in the RAI corporation (RAI Trade). From 1998 onwards he taught, among the others, at the University of Siena and at the Sapienza University of Rome. Since 1974, Parascandolo has won numerous awards for his activity as journalist and as editor-in-chief of many television programs in several scientific and cultural fields: "Cronaca" (1974-1986), "Prima Pagina" (1976-1981), "Multimedia Encyclopaedia of the Philosophical Sciences" (1987-2008, under the aegis of the UNESCO), "MediaMente"(1994-2002), and many others.

As an author, he published seven writings on issues related to television, with a particular focus on the topic of the Information Society. In 1984, he was co-director of the documentary film Addio a Enrico Berlinguer (Farewell to Enrico Berlinguer).
