= Fakhreddine Karray =

Tunisian-Canadian artificial intelligence scientist and engineer

Fakhreddine (Fakhri) Karray
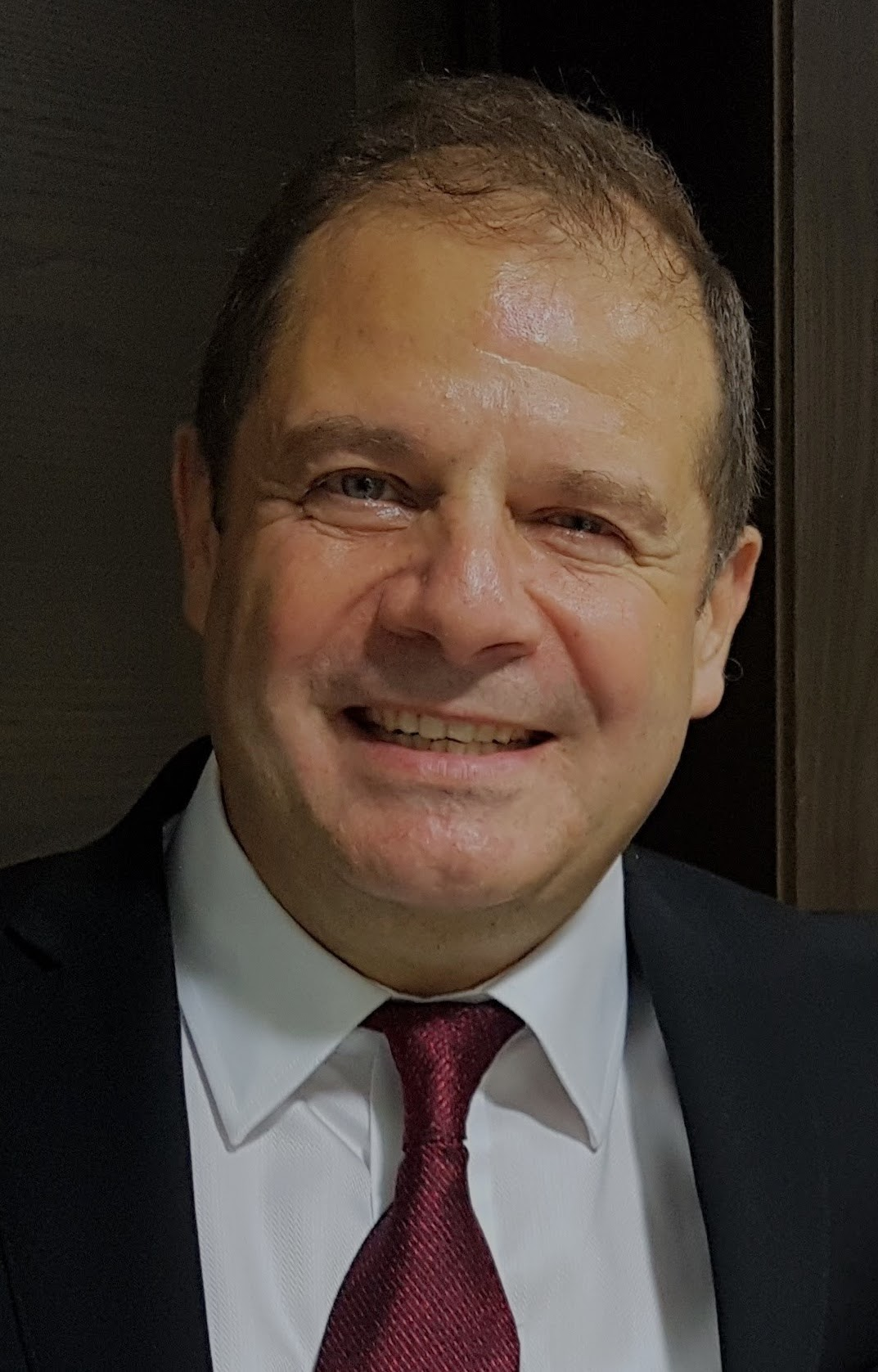
- Years active: 1990-present
- Awards: Fellow, Institute of Electrical and Electronics Engineers; Fellow, Canadian Academy of Engineering; Fellow, Engineering Institute of Canada

Academic background
- Education: University of Illinois Urbana-Champaign, USA (PhD); University of Tunis, Tunisia (Ing. Dip)

Academic work
- Discipline: Intelligent agents, sensor fusion, operational artificial Intelligence, generative artificial intelligence
- Institutions: Mohamed bin Zayed University of Artificial Intelligence (2021-present); University of Waterloo (1997-present); Waterloo Artificial Intelligence Institute (2018-2021)
- Notable works: Soft Computing and Intelligent Systems Design (2004); Elements of Dimensionality Reduction and Manifold Learning (2023)

Fakhreddine (Fakhri) Karray is a Tunisian-Canadian artificial intelligence scientist, electrical and computer engineer, author, and academic. He served as the Loblaws Research Chair of Artificial Intelligence at the University of Waterloo's (UWaterloo) Department of Electrical and Computer Engineering, and as the inaugural co-director of the Waterloo AI Institute at UWaterloo. Having previously served as the provost of Mohamed bin Zayed University of Artificial Intelligence (MBZUAI), he serves as a professor of machine learning at the university and as an emeritus professor at the University of Waterloo's Department of Electrical and Computer Engineering.

Karray's research interests encompass operational and generative AI, cognitive machines, natural human-machine interaction, and autonomous and intelligent systems. He has published in the fields of pattern analysis and machine intelligence and is the co-author of Elements of Dimensionality Reduction and Manifold Learning and Soft Computing and Intelligent Systems Design. His work on operational AI has been applied to intelligent transportation systems, virtual healthcare, and driver safety with him being featured in The Washington Post, Wired, The Globe and Mail, and CBC. He holds twenty US patents and has won the IEEE Vehicular Technology Society's Best Land Transportation Award for his work on improving traffic flow prediction with weather Information in connected cars and the MeditCom Conference Best Paper Award for his study on federated learning in communication systems.

Karray is a Fellow of the Institute of Electrical and Electronics Engineers (IEEE), Kavli Frontiers of Science, the Canadian Academy of Engineering. and the Engineering Institute of Canada.

== Education ==
Karray received his Ing. Dip. in electrical engineering from the University of Tunis in 1984 followed by a Ph.D. from the University of Illinois Urbana-Champaign in 1989.

== Career ==
Karray served as a Distinguished Lecturer for the IEEE Robotics and Automation Society. He is the former Provost of MBZUAI, a research-based AI university in Abu Dhabi, and has been serving as its Professor of Machine Learning. He held the position of Loblaws Research Chair in Artificial Intelligence in the Department of Electrical and Computer Engineering at UWaterloo and served as a Founding Co-Director of its AI Institute. He is also the Co-Founder and Chief Scientist of Yourika, a provider of AI-based online learning systems.

== Research ==
Karray has focused his research on operational and generative AI, cognitive and self-aware machines, natural human-machine interaction, and autonomous intelligent systems, with applications in virtual care systems, cognitive devices, and predictive analytics for intelligent transportation systems and supply chain management.

=== Transportation safety and traffic flow prediction ===
Exploring the impact of weather on transportation systems, Karray proposed an integrated deep learning architecture for enhanced traffic flow prediction using weather parameters in connected cars leading him to win the Best Land Transportation Paper Award. He then developed driver distraction recognition systems with generative adversarial networks to improve safety by identifying distracted driving behaviors. In an interview with Craig Norris, host of The Morning Edition on CBC Radio, he said "We have provided the system also with other abnormal behavior, driving behavior, and we taught the system to start working and generating classes." Building on this research, he proposed a visual-based lane following system using a long-term recurrent convolutional neural network exploring the fusion of temporal history to predict future control variables with high accuracy. His advancements in driver monitoring involved the introduction of a deep recurrent neural network-based system which predicted imminent driving maneuvers by utilizing both driver behavior and environmental data.

=== Artificial intelligence methods, intelligent systems and human-computer interaction ===
Karray, along with Benyamin Ghojogh, Mark Crowley, and Ali Ghodsi, published Elements of Dimensionality Reduction and Manifold Learning providing a review of dimensionality reduction techniques, covering spectral, probabilistic, and neural network-based methods, with essential background in linear algebra, optimization, and kernels. Previously, in his book, Soft Computing and Intelligent Systems Design: Theory, Tools and Applications, co-authored with Clarence W. De Silva, he discussed the evolution of artificial intelligence (AI) tracing its development from traditional symbolic logic-based techniques to modern biologically-inspired methods, highlighting their integration into academic curricula. His overview of Human-Computer Interaction (HCI) included a survey of existing technologies and recent advancements, common system architectures, and various applications of HCI, offering a list of references for each concept.

=== Medical diagnostics using tools of AI ===
Karray has applied technologies to improve diagnostic accuracy and user interaction. He presented a knowledge-based natural speech dialogue system that integrated flexible dialogue control and context information retention, enabling effective handling of complex user requests and supporting mixed-initiative conversations. Participating in the first international microaneurysm detection competition, he compared five different automated methods for diabetic retinopathy screening against human experts, highlighting the challenges and advancements in detecting microaneurysms from digital color fundus photographs. Further refining his focus on retinal image analysis, he introduced the MF-FDOG method, a novel approach that enhanced vessel extraction in computer-aided diagnosis by combining the original matched filter with the first-order derivative of Gaussian. His subsequent work focused on diabetic retinopathy diagnosis used multi-scale correlation filtering (MSCF) and dynamic thresholding for more accurate microaneurysm detection and classification. While conducting a survey on speech emotion classification, he designed effective classification schemes and prepared emotional speech databases to improve system evaluation. In 2021, his research on COVID-19 diagnosis reviewed deep learning-based systems by using medical imaging modalities such as CT and X-ray.

== Awards and honors ==
- 2011 – Pattern Recognition Society Medal for Best Paper Award, Pattern Recognition Society
- 2016 – Distinguished Lecturer, IEEE
- 2018 – Fellow, Canadian Academy of Engineering
- 2020 – Fellow, IEEE
- 2020 – Fellow, Engineering Institute of Canada
- 2021 – Best Land Transportation Paper Award, IEEE
- 2022 – MeditCom Best Paper Award, IEEE

== Bibliography ==
=== Selected books ===
- Soft Computing and Intelligent Systems Design: Theory, Tools and Applications (2004) ISBN 978-8131723241
- Elements of Dimensionality Reduction and Manifold Learning (2023) ISBN 978-3031106040

=== Selected articles ===
- Karray, F., Alemzadeh, M., Abou Saleh, J., & Arab, M. N. (2008). Human-computer interaction: Overview on state of the art. International Journal on Smart Sensing and Intelligent Systems, 1(1), 137-159.
- Niemeijer, M., Van Ginneken, B., Cree, M. J., Mizutani, A., Quellec, G., Sánchez, C. I., ... & Abràmoff, M. D. (2009). Retinopathy online challenge: automatic detection of microaneurysms in digital color fundus photographs. IEEE Transactions on Medical Imaging, 29(1), 185-195.
- Zhang, B., Zhang, L., Zhang, L., & Karray, F. (2010). Retinal vessel extraction by matched filter with first-order derivative of Gaussian. Computers in Biology and Medicine, 40(4), 438-445.
- El Ayadi, M., Kamel, M. S., & Karray, F. (2011). Survey on speech emotion recognition: Features, classification schemes, and databases. Pattern Recognition, 44(3), 572-587.
- Khaleghi, B., Khamis, A., Karray, F. O., & Razavi, S. N. (2013). Multisensor data fusion: A review of the state-of-the-art. Information Fusion, 14(1), 28-44.
- Koesdwiady, A., Soua, R., & Karray, F. (2016). Improving traffic flow prediction with weather information in connected cars: A deep learning approach. IEEE Transactions on Vehicular Technology, 65(12), 9508-9517.
- Muhammad, G., Alshehri, F., Karray, F., El Saddik, A., Alsulaiman, M., & Falk, T. H. (2021). A comprehensive survey on multimodal medical signals fusion for smart healthcare systems. Information Fusion, 76, 355-375.
- Islam, M. M., Karray, F., Alhajj, R., & Zeng, J. (2021). A review on deep learning techniques for the diagnosis of novel coronavirus (COVID-19). IEEE Access, 9, 30551-30572.

== Selected patents ==
- O. Basir, F. Karray, K. Desrochers, J.P. Bhavnani, D. Bullock, I. Rahim, "Vehicle Visual and Non-Visual Data Recording System," United States Patent US7983811, Issued: July 19, 2011
- J. Sun, F. Karray and O. Basir, "Knowledge Based Flexible Natural Speech Dialogue System," United States Patent US7386449, Issued: June 10, 2008
- S. Shehata, F. Karray, M. Kamel, "Methods and Systems for Extracting Keyphrases from Natural Text for Search Engines," United States Patent US9390161, Issued: July 12, 2016
- S. Shehata, F. Karray, M. Kamel, "System, Method and Computer Program for Searching Within a Sub-Domain by Linking to Other Subdomain," United States Patent US9075879, Issued: July 7, 2015
- M. Aloqaily, H ElAyan, M. Guizani, F. karray, "Cooperative Health Intelligent Emergency Response System for Cooperative Intelligent Transport Systems," United States Patent # 12125117, Issued October 2024
