= Barbara Gallavotti =

Italian biologist (born 1968)

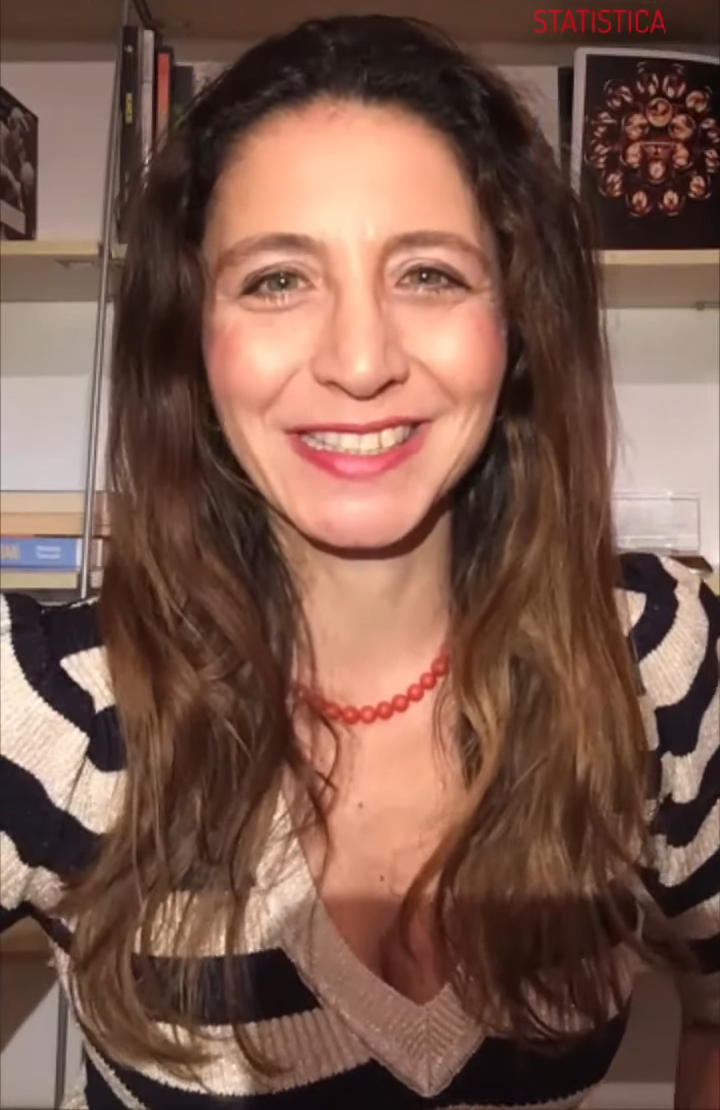
Gallavotti in 2020

Barbara Gallavotti (born December 21, 1967) is an Italian biologist, award winning journalist, television author and science communicator, particularly for child audiences. She authored TV science shows including Ulisse(RAI3) and SuperQuark (RAI1). Gallavotti authored numerous science books for children.

== Biography and career ==
Born in Turin but raised in Rome, Gallavotti completed her undergraduate studies in 1986. In 1993 she graduated in biology, with a specialization in genetics and molecular biology, from the University of Sapienza University of Rome, and in 1994, she passed the qualifying examination for the profession of biologist.

After starting her career as a biologist, Gallavotti decided to devote herself to the popularization of science and began her collaboration with Galileo, the first Italian online journal dedicated to the themes of scientific research and technology. Over the years, she has worked with several newspapers and radio stations, both generalist such as Panorama, La Stampa and Il Corriere della Sera, as well as more specialized news outlets such as Newton magazine, enrolling in the register of journalists in 2001. Gallavotti has become well known in the field of popular science, writing books for children and young people on various scientific topics. She works as an author of television programs, having started with Ulisse - Il piacere della scoperta hosted by Alberto Angela in 2000. She continued with the children's program Hit Science in 2004 on Rai Tre. In 2007, she became correspondent of Superquark, hosted by Piero Angela, whom Gallavotti cites as her foremost teacher. In 2010 Gallavotti collaborated with the program E se domani, hosted first by Alex Zanardi and then by Massimiliano Ossini, becoming a correspondent in 2013.

From 2007 to 2008, Gallavotti held the position of temporary director of the Master in Communication of Science and Technology at the University of Tor Vergata, in Rome, and in 2009, she taught a course in communication sciences as adjunct professor at the Faculty of Communication Sciences of the Roma Tre University.

Gallavotti has written several books, oriented in particular to a young audience, including: Il sistema solare, L'Universo, La vita sulla Terra. In May 2019 she co-authored the book Le grandi epidemie - come difendersi (tr. "Major epidemics - how to defend yourself"), published by Donzelli with a preface by Piero Angela. As a result of the success of this publication, in 2020, Gallavotti was called as a regular guest to the program Dimartedì, broadcast by LA7 and conducted by Giovanni Floris, where she reports the latest news on the COVID-19 pandemic.

Since 2022, she has been the host and author of the popular science TV program Quinta Dimensione broadcast on the Rai 3, on Saturday nights.

Winner of numerous awards and prizes, including the Capo d'Orlando Award for multimedia communication which she received in 2013, Gallavotti is also an advisor for the scientific coordination of the National Museum of Science and Technology "Leonardo da Vinci" in Milan.

== Published works ==
- I segreti della vita (in Italian). Rimini: Idealibri. 1997. ISBN 88-7082-362-8.
- L'ecologia (in Italian). Rimini: Idealibri. 1998. ISBN 88-7082-568-X.
  - L'ecologia (in Italian). Illustrated by Gian Paolo Faleschini. Florence: La biblioteca. 2001. ISBN 88-86961-45-6.
- La vita sulla Terra (in Italian). Rimini: Idealibri. 1998. ISBN 88-7082-522-1.
- Il corpo umano: strategie di una macchina perfetta (in Italian). Illustrated by Studio Inklink. Milan: Mondadori. 1999. ISBN 88-04-46996-X.
- Gallavotti, Barbara; Bachiorri, Antonella (1999). Educare per la biodiversità: idee e proposte di educazione ambientale (in Italian). Rome: Editur. ICCU IT\ICCU\GEA\0088909.
- Il sistema solare (in Italian). Illustrated by Alessandro Bartolozzi. Florence: La biblioteca. 1999. ISBN 88-86961-21-9.
- Gallavotti, Barbara; Capuzzo Dolcetta, Roberto (2000). L'Universo: origine, teorie, prospettive (in Italian). Illustrated by Alessandro Bartolozzi. Milan: Mondadori. ISBN 88-04-48332-6.
- Le grandi epidemie: come difendersi: tutto quello che dovreste sapere sui microbi (in Italian). In collaboration with Francesco Maria Galassi. Preface by Piero Angela. Rome: Donzelli. 2019. ISBN 978-88-6843-882-1.
- Confini invisibili. Quello che abbiamo imparato sui microbi e le sfide che ci aspettano (in Italian). Rome: Mondadori. 2022. ISBN 978-8804741176.
- L'infinito dentro di me. Dagli atomi alle balene, alla scoperta dell'Universo e dei segreti della vita (in Italian). Rome: De Agostini. 2023. ISBN 979-1221202656.
