= Paola Velardi =

Professor of computer science

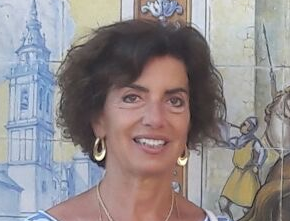
- Born: April 26, 1955 (age 71); Rome, Italy
- Education: Stanford University
- Scientific career
- Fields: Computer science
- Workplaces: Sapienza University of Rome

Paola Velardi (born in Rome, April 26, 1955) is a full professor of computer science at Sapienza University in Rome, Italy. Her research encompasses Artificial Intelligence and specifically, natural language processing, machine learning business intelligence and semantic web. Velardi is one of the hundred female scientists included in the database "100esperte.it" (translated from Italian with "100 female experts"). This online, open database champions the recognition of top-rated female scientists in Science, Technology, Engineering and Mathematics (STEM) areas. Among her prestigious appointments and honors, her inclusion stands out —alongside 45 other international female scientists from the past, present, and future— in the Women in Science pavilion of UNESCO's Virtual Science Museum.

== Research ==
Paola Velardi's research activity has focused, since the early 1980s, on Artificial Intelligence, with a particular emphasis on natural language processing (NLP), Machine learning, and data mining. Her scientific contributions have evolved over time, following the sector's primary paradigms:

Semantic Web and Ontologies: She is known for her pioneering work on semantic disambiguation and automated ontology learning, collaborating on the development of systems such as OntoLearn.

Social Computing and Predictive Analysis: She has conducted research on extracting information from social media for epidemiological monitoring (syndromic surveillance) and for the identification of opinion leaders. In the educational field, she has developed machine learning models to predict the risk of student dropout.

AI for Health and Elder Monitoring: She has coordinated projects to support frailty in the elderly, developing systems based on ambient intelligence and wearables to detect clinical and behavioral anomalies. She has also contributed to models for analyzing behavioral changes through dynamic clustering.

Generative AI and Finance: More recently, her research has expanded into the use of generative AI and deep learning for finance, including benchmark studies on price trend prediction based on Limit Order Books (LOB) and the development of diffusion models for realistic market simulation (the TRADES project).

According to Google Scholar bibliometrics updated until December 2025, Velardi's scientific publications have been cited more than 8100 times. Her h-index was 42. She has published more than 200 papers in international journals and conference proceedings. Some of her publications have been published in top rated journals such as Artificial Intelligence, Computational Linguistics, Knowledge-Based Systems, IEEE Transactions on Knowledge and Data Engineering , IEEE Transactions on Pattern Analysis and Machine Intelligence, IEEE Transactions on Computers, IEEE Transactions on Software Engineering , Data Mining and Knowledge Discovery, and Journal of Web Semantics.

== Education and previous employments ==
Velardi graduated in electronic engineering from Sapienza University in 1978. From 1978 to 1983, she worked for the Ugo Bordoni Foundation, a research institution focusing on ICT and working under the supervision of the Italian Ministry of Economic Development. In 1983, she was a visiting scholar at Stanford University. During this period she became passionate about Artificial Intelligence, which will remain her area of research throughout her career. From 1984 to 1986, she came back to her natal city and worked as a researcher for IBM. From 1986 to 1996 she was an associate professor in the engineering faculty of Polytechnic University of the Marches (Ancona, Italy). Starting in November 1996, she taught in and did research for the Department of Computer Science at the Sapienza University. Velardi was the head of Bachelor and Master Programs in Computer Science at Sapienza University from 2010 to 2013 and from 2015 to 2016.

== Current employment ==
Since November 2001, Velardi has been a full professor in the department of computer science ("Dipartimento di Informatica" in Italian) at Sapienza University in Rome, Italy.

Since 2013, she has been the coordinator of the Distance Learning Degree in Computer Science at Sapienza University.

As of today, Velardi is a Senior Associate at the Institute of Cognitive Sciences and Technologies (ISTC) of the CNR.

== Recognition ==
Velardi is one of the hundred female scientists included in the database "100esperte.it" (translated from Italian with "100 female experts"). This database lists top Italian female STEM scientists. Six out of one hundred scientists in the 100esperte's database are computer scientists like Velardi.

Velardi is in the list of the top Italian scientists. A top scientist appearing in the Top-Italian-Scientists database is a scientist whose h-index is greater than 30.

In March 2017, she was given an IBM Faculty Award for her research on social recommender systems.

In December 2018, Velardi was included in the list of the 50 most influential Italian women in science and technology by Inspiring Fifty, a non-profit that aims to increase diversity in STEM by making female role models in tech more visible.

In September 2019 she was the local co-organizer and Program Chair of the 6th ACM Celebration of Women in Computing.

In November 2019 Velardi received the Standout Woman Award International at the seat of the Italian Parliament in Montecitorio.

== Causes ==
Velardi aims at debunking the myth of computer science as a man-oriented and "inflexible" discipline. She is the founder of the project "NERD? Non e' roba per donne?" (translated from Italian: "NERD? Is it not stuff for women?"). This project was launched by Velardi in 2012 in the Department of Computer Science at Sapienza University. Since 2013 the project has been carried out in partnership with IBM Italy, which later created a spin-off of the project. The goal of the project is two-fold: (1) conveying computer science as creative, interdisciplinary and problem-solving-oriented science, and (2) encouraging young female students in studying computer science by, for instance, developing apps for smartphones. She has been the program chair of the 19th ACM celebration of Women in Computing. She is the creator and coordinator of the G4GRETA, an educational project that involves students of the third and fourth grades of Rome and Lazio. The project combines the development of IT skills with the themes of environmental sustainability and soft skills (teambuilding, pitching, social networking, etc.)

Velardi is also involved in scientific dissemination. In 2020 and 2021 she cooperated with RaiCultura, the cultural division of RAI, the national broadcasting company.
