= Minerva (model) =

Italian artificial intelligence project

- Developer: Sapienza NLP research group at Sapienza University of Rome
- Initial release: April 2024; 2 years ago
- Operating system: Web app
- Available in: Italian, English
- Type: Chatbot; Large language model
- Website: minerva-llm.org

Minerva is a large language model developed by an Italian research group, Sapienza NLP, at Sapienza University of Rome, led by Roberto Navigli. It is trained from scratch with a primary focus on the Italian language.

It is a model for Natural Language Processing tasks, capable of understanding and generating human-like text. This model utilizes deep learning techniques, specifically a Transformer architecture, to process and generate text. It has been trained on a large corpus of text data and has been fine-tuned to perform various language tasks, such as language translation, text summarization, and question answering.

== Models ==
=== Minerva 7B ===
Minerva 7B has 7 billion parameters and was trained on a dataset containing approximately 2.5 trillion tokens, split equally between Italian and English texts, as well as 200 billion tokens of code.

The development of Minerva 7B was carried out within the Future Artificial Intelligence Research (FAIR) project, in collaboration with CINECA, which provided the Leonardo (supercomputer) for training. Additional contributions came from Babelscape and the CREATIVE PRIN Project. Notably, Minerva models are truly open, with both data and models accessible to the public.

=== ChatMinerva ===
In 2026, an extended version of the Minerva LLM, capable of processing long documents and visual inputs, was integrated into a multimodal AI assistant, ChatMinerva, which combines the model with web search, enhanced safety, and optical character recognition components.

== See also ==
- Sapienza University of Rome
- CINECA
