= Global Index on Responsible AI =

Cross-country index on responsible AI

The Global Index on Responsible AI (GIRAI) is a study that scores countries on national policies, human rights, and institutional capacity related to artificial intelligence (AI) and it is produced by the Global Center on AI Governance, a South African-based research organization.

== First edition (2024) ==
The first edition of GIRAI was released in June 2024 and covered 138 countries and juridictions. The Netherlands received the highest score, which was 86.16 out of 100. The score was drawn from more than 1,800 questions per country answered by local researchers and generated more than two million data points from November 1, 2021 and it ended in November 1, 2023. These data points were now reviewed by outside experts from different organisation before the publication. The other top countries were Germany, Ireland, the United Kingdom and the USA.

== Second edition (2026) ==
A second edition was published in 2026. It assessed 135 countries and jurisdictions by using more than 68,000 data points that covered legislation, policy, government implementation, civil-society activity, and underlying conditions such as rule of law, labour rights, cybersecurity, and access to information. Norway received the highest overall score, 75.26 out of 100, followed by Italy (72.71), Ireland (71.39), France (70.32), and the Netherlands (69.51); the global average score was approximately 35 out of 100.

Nigeria was ranked thirty-eight globally but scored the highest points in Africa with 45.93 followed by Egypt. In East and Southeast Asia, Japan scored the highest point, followed by South Korea, Singapore, China and Hongkong.

=== Percentage of countries with AI policy on Misinformation and Violence ===
GIRAI 2026 edition also found regional differences in the adoption of policy frameworks that address AI-driven misinformation and violence.

Region	Share of countries with frameworks
North America	100%
Europe	75%
South and Central America	43%
Asia and Oceania	37%
Middle East	20%
Caribbean	13%
Africa	8%
