= Roberto Giacobbo =

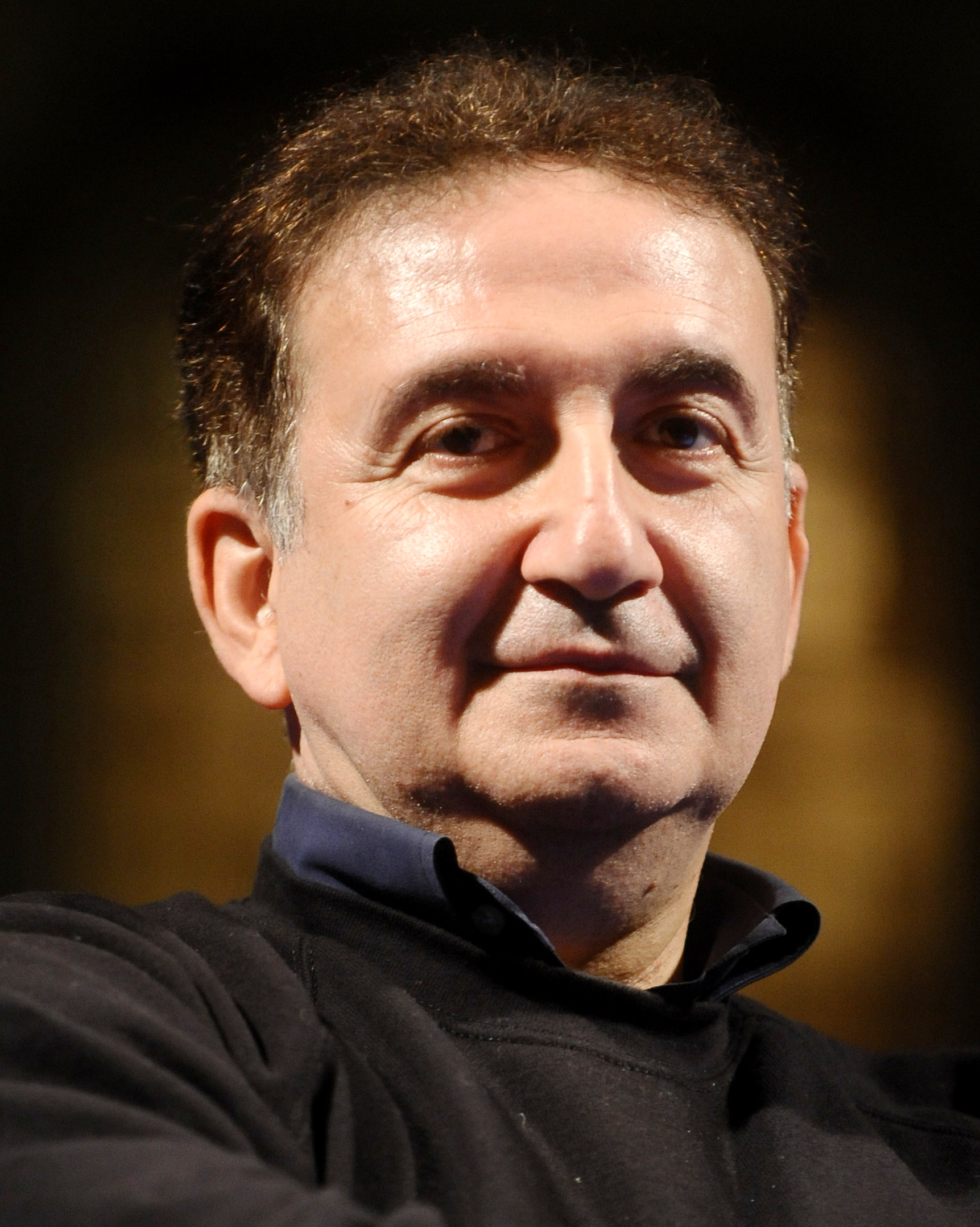
- Born: 12 October 1961 (age 64); Rome, Italy
- Occupation(s): Journalist, writer, TV presenter
- Height: 1.98 m (6 ft 6 in)
- Spouse: Irene Bellini (m. 1994)
- Children: 3

Roberto Giacobbo (born 12 October 1961) is an Italian journalist, author, television presenter and television writer.

He has a bachelor's degree in Economics and Commerce.

He has been the presenter of cultural programs on Italian television, wrote and published numerous books and articles about archaeology and scientific discoveries.

He was the author and presenter of the television program Voyager - Ai confini della conoscenza, popular program of the Italian channel Rai Due.

Currently Head of Authoritative Group and Contents Television Network of the Italian channel Focus and presenter of Mediaset network Rete 4 with his Freedom - Oltre il confine.

He considers himself Roman Catholic.

== Books ==
- Giacobbo, Roberto; Luna, Riccardo (1997). Chi ha veramente costruito le piramidi e la sfinge (in Italian). Rome: Stampa alternativa. ISBN 88-7226-383-2.
- Giacobbo, Roberto; Luna, Riccardo (1997). Ecco perché hanno costruito le piramidi: la soluzione dell'enigma della Sfinge (in Italian). Rome: Elle-Wage. ICCU IT\ICCU\RML\0066673.
- Giacobbo, Roberto; Luna, Riccardo (1998). Il libro degli strafatti 1998: le cento notizie più divertenti dell'anno (e le dieci migliori barzellette) (in Italian). (As Bob Jacob & Ricky Moon). Rome: Newton Compton. ISBN 88-8289-106-2.
- Giacobbo, Roberto; Luna, Riccardo (1998). Il segreto di Cheope: alla ricerca del tesoro perduto delle piramidi (in Italian). Rome: Newton & Compton. ISBN 88-8183-990-3.
- Il segreto di Leonardo: sulle tracce di Maria (in Italian). Rome-Milan: Rai-ERI-Rizzoli. 2005. ISBN 88-17-00813-3.
- Leonardo da Vinci: grande genio (in Italian). Florence: Giunti. 2006. ISBN 88-09-04696-X.
- Le piramidi: mistero e realtà (in Italian). Florence: Giunti. 2006. ISBN 88-09-04697-8.
- Il ragionevole dubbio: le risposte degli scienziati di fronte al mistero della vita oltre la vita (in Italian). Florence: Giunti. 2007. ISBN 978-88-09-05101-0.
- I misteri di Voyager (in Italian). Florence: Giunti. 2008. ISBN 978-88-09-05882-8.
- 2012: la fine del mondo? (in Italian). Rome-Milan: Rai-ERI-Mondadori. 2009. ISBN 978-88-04-58633-3.
- Atlante dei mondi perduti (in Italian). Florence: Giunti. 2009. ISBN 978-88-09-06152-1.
- I misteri di Voyager 2 (in Italian). Florence-Milan: Giunti. 2010. ISBN 978-88-09-75291-7.
- Templari: dov'è il tesoro? (in Italian). Rome-Milan: Rai-ERI-Mondadori. 2010. ISBN 978-88-04-59679-0.
- Aldilà: la vita continua? Un'indagine sorprendente (in Italian). Rome-Milan: Rai-ERI-Mondadori. 2011. ISBN 978-88-04-61030-4.
- Le carte del mistero: 100 domande e risposte (in Italian). Florence: Giunti junior. 2011. ISBN 978-88-09-76760-7.
- Da dove veniamo? (in Italian). Rome-Milan: Rai-ERI-Mondadori. 2012. ISBN 978-88-04-62113-3.
- Conosciamo davvero Gesù? (in Italian). Rome-Milan: Rai-ERI-Mondadori. 2013. ISBN 978-88-04-62922-1.
- La donna faraone (in Italian). Milan: Mondadori. 2014. ISBN 978-88-04-64051-6.
- Città segrete (in Italian). Rome-Milan: Rai-ERI-Mondadori. 2015. ISBN 978-88-04-65418-6.
- Le carezze cambiano il DNA: il segreto dell'epigenetica (in Italian). Milan: Mondadori. 2016. ISBN 978-88-04-66356-0.
- Giacobbo, Roberto; Botta, Valeria (2017). L'uomo che fermò l'apocalisse (in Italian). Rome: Rai-ERI. ISBN 978-88-39-71707-8.
- Giacobbo, Roberto; Zerbini, Livio (2018). Il segreto di Annibale: 218 a.C. il viaggio che cambiò la storia (in Italian). Rome: Rai-ERI. ISBN 978-88-397-1740-5.
- Storia alternativa del mondo: un viaggio pieno di sorprese nel cammino dell'uomo (in Italian). Milan: Mondadori. 2020. ISBN 978-8804712114.
