= Ministry of Enterprises and Made in Italy =

Government ministry of Italy

- Ministero delle imprese e del made in Italy; MIMIT

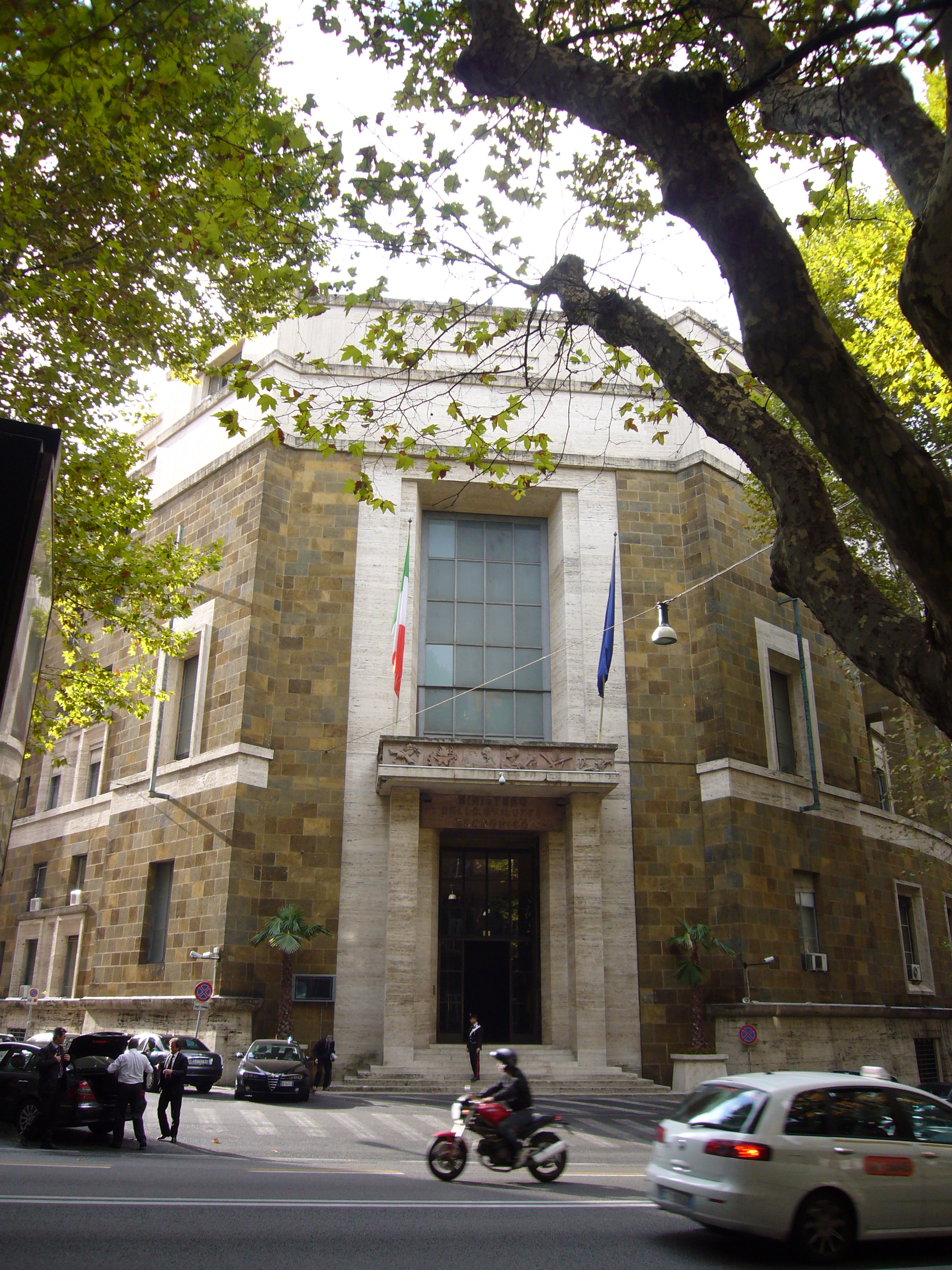
- Headquarters of the MiSE in Palazzo Piacentini

Ministry of the Italian Republic overview
- Formed: 2006; 20 years ago
- Preceding agencies: Ministry of National Economy (1923-1929); Ministry of Corporations (1929-1943); Ministry of Industry and Trade Ministry of Labour and Social Security (1945-1946); Ministry of Industry, Trade and Handicraft (1966-1997); Ministry of Productive Activities (1997-2006); Ministry of Economic Development (2006-2022)
- Jurisdiction: Government of Italy
- Headquarters: Via Vittorio Veneto 33, 00187 Rome
- Minister responsible: Adolfo Urso
- Deputy Ministers responsible: Alessandra Todde; Gilberto Pichetto Fratin
- Website: www.mimit.gov.it/it/

The Ministry of Enterprises and Made in Italy (Ministero delle imprese e del made in Italy), commonly known under the shortening of its pre-2022 name, MISE, is a government ministry of the Italian Republic. It deals with production, economic activities, energy and mineral resources, telecommunications, consumers, tourism, internationalisation and business incentives. It was formed in 2006 after the reorganization of the Ministry of Productive Activities (called Ministry of Industry, Trade and Handicraft until 2001) to which were merged the Ministry of Communications and the Ministry of International Trade in 2008.

The current minister is Adolfo Urso, appointed on 22 October 2022 by Prime Minister Giorgia Meloni. The headquarters is located in Palazzo Piacentini, via Vittorio Veneto, Rome.

== History ==
=== Kingdom of Italy ===
Since the Italian unification in 1861, policies related to productive activities were made by the Ministry for Agriculture, Industry and Trade, which was eliminated by the Depretis II Cabinet in 1877 and restored by Cairoli I Cabinet in 1878. In 1916, with the Boselli Cabinet, competences on labour and social security were added while the one on agriculture was removed: the dicastery became then the Ministry for Industry, Trade and Labour. In 1920, the Nitti II Cabinet established the Ministry of Labour and Social Security, maintaining the Ministry of Industry and Trade.

Several transformations occurred during the Mussolini Cabinet: the Ministry of National Economy was established in 1923 with the merger of the Ministries of Labour and Social Security, of Industry and Trade and of Agriculture, but it was later abolished in 1929 and its competences on agriculture were given to the reconstituted Ministry of Agriculture and Forestry, and those related to industry, trade and labour were transferred to the existing Ministry of Corporations. With the fall of Fascism, the Badoglio I Cabinet abolished the last one and recreated the Ministry for Industry, Trade and Labour.

=== After World War II and republican period ===
During the second post-war period, the Parri Cabinet subdivided again in 1945 the competences between the Ministry of Industry and Trade and the Ministry of Labour and Social Security, while the De Gasperi II Cabinet spun off also the Ministry of Foreign Trade in 1946. In 1966, with Moro III Cabinet, the competence on handicrafts was added and the Dicastery was renamed in Ministry of Industry, Trade and Handicraft.

In order to reduce the number of Ministries, the Bassanini reforms issued between 1997 and 1999 and further implementing decrees determined the creation of the Ministry of Productive Activities, after the merging between the Ministries of Industry, of Foreign Trade and Communications. However, the last one was maintained autonomous by the Berlusconi II Cabinet in 2001.

In 2001, with the Prodi II Cabinet, the Department for Development and Economic Cohesion was incorporated into the Ministry of Treasury, Budget and Economic Planning (renamed later as Ministry of Economy and Finance) and the new Ministry of International Trade was established in 2006, along with the Ministry of Economic Development.

Only in 2008 the Bassanini reform was re-established and the MiSE included the functions of the Ministries of Communication and International Trade, which ceased to exists with the Berlusconi IV Cabinet. The last modification occurred in 2013 with the spun off of the Department for Development and Economic Cohesion and the creation of the new Agency for Territorial Cohesion under MiSE.

With Meloni's election in 2022, the Ministry of Economic Development (Ministero dello Sviluppo Economico) was renamed to Ministry of Enterprises and Made in Italy.

== Competences ==
According to the Decree n. 158 of 5 December 2013, MiSE has competences related to four areas of the Italian economy:

- Industrial policies in favour of competitiveness, industrial research and innovation, technology transfers, patents and trademarks, struggle against counterfeiting, funds and benefits for companies, productive reconversion and reorganization, management of corporate crisis, support to small and medium enterprises, promotion and valorization of products 'Made in Italy', consumer protection, monitoring of prices, promotion of competition, simplifications for enterprises and others required by law.
- Policies for internationalization: exports, trade facilitation with foreign countries, commercial strategies within the European Union, multilateral and bilateral agreements, promotion of Italian investments abroad, attraction of foreign investments in Italy, instruments for commercial defence, promotion of 'Made in Italy'.
- Energy policies: national energy budged and strategy, transport networks, energy infrastructures, security of supplies, single European market of electricity, promotion of renewable energy and energy efficiency, reduction of greenhouse gas emissions, dismantle of decommissioned nuclear plants and pacific usage of nuclear energy, national gas market, oil plants and market, national mining policies, downstream oil system and related market, storage of natural gas.
- Communication policies: regulation of electronic communications, radio and TV broadcasting and postal sector, service agreements with RAI e Poste Italiane, distribution of frequencies for radio and TV broadcasting services, cellular networks and emergency services, monitoring and control of the national radio-electric spectrum, infrastructural programme for broadband.

Functions of MiSE and its bodies actuate the dispositions of the Italian and European Consumption Code, Private Insurance Code, Industrial Property Code, Electronic Communications Code.

The Minister is a member of the High Council of Defence and appoints the General Secretary of the Italian Competition Authority.

== Overseen entities and controlled companies ==
=== Public entities ===
As of 15 July 2019, MiSE oversees the following public entities:

- Banco nazionale di prova per le armi da fuoco portatili e per le munizioni commerciali (instrumental entity for ballistic tests)
- ENEA
- Ente nazionale per il microcredito
- Agenzia per la promozione all'estero e l'internazionalizzazione delle impresse italiane (ICE)
- Italian Chamber System (Chambers of Commerce, Unioncamere, regional unions, special companies)
- Accredia - Ente italiano di accreditamento

=== Shareholdings ===
As of 4 and 11 July 2019, MiSE holds the following shares:

- C.F.I. S.c.p.A. – Cooperazione Finanza Impresa (98,32%)
- SO.FI.COOP. – Società Finanza Cooperazione (99,85%)

=== Private entities ===
As of 4 July 2019, MiSE owns the following entities:

- Fondazione Ugo Bordoni
- GSE S.p.A. – Gestore Servizi Energetici
- Invitalia

== Internal organization ==
The Ministry is formed by the Cabinet offices collaborating directly with the Minister, the General Secretary Office, 14 General Directions (Direzioni generali, DG) and various commissions and committees.

=== General Directions ===
According to the decree 158/2013, the General Directions of MiSE are the following:

- DG for Industrial Policy, Competitiveness and SMEs: it deals with the actuation of policies in favour of competition, research and innovation, analysis of the Italian productive system.
- DG for the Struggle Against Counterfeiting - Italian Patent and Trademark Office: it formulates provisions regarding anti-counterfeiting policies and studies the trend of the phenomena, coordinating operations along with other state bodies; it is competent also for the protection of national (and international) industrial properties and trademarks.
- DG for Market, Competition, Consumers, Vigilance and Technical Regulation: it promotes competition and regulations regarding liberalizations, simplifications for enterprises and requirements for each economical activity; it also manages the relations between enterprises and the Italian Competition Authority, gives support to the Prices Monitoring Authority and actuates national, European and international policies belonging to its competence.
- DG for International Trade Policy: it deals with activities in favour of Italian exportations and manages the application of European directives and the agreements with international organizations (WTO, OECD, UNCTAD) and foreign countries
- DG for Internationalization Policies and Promotion of Exchanges: it has more specific competences than the previous DG and elaborates strategical provisions for trade policies with foreign countries, managing negotiations and facilitating the international trade of Italian companies
- DG for General and Environmental Security of Mining and Energy Activities - National Mining Office for Hydrocarbons and Georesources
- DG for Supply Security and Energy Infrastructures
- DG for Energy Market, Renewable Energies and Efficiency, Nuclear
- DG for Planning and Management of Radioelectric Spectrum
- DG for Electronic Communication, Radio broadcasting and Postal Services: it studies the evolution of services related to electronic communication, radio broadcasting and mail, predisposing regulations and actuating European laws. It gives licences to private operators providing such communication services according to laws in force.
- Higher Institute of Communications and Information Technologies (Istituto superiore delle comunicazioni e delle tecnologie dell'informazione, ISCOM)
- DG for Territorial Activities
- DG for Benefits to Enterprises
- DG for Supervision on Entities, the Cooperative System and Commissarial Managements
- DG for Resources, Organization and Budget

=== Committees and other bodies ===
MiSE oversees the following bodies:

- Single Guarantee Committee:
- Committee for the Application of the Autoregulation Code of Media and Underages: previously known as "Committee for the Application of the Autoregulation Code of TV and Underages", it was established in 2005 in order to ensure the application of the Autoregulation Code of Media and Underages by broadcasters. Its deliberations and denounces are received by the Italian Communication Authority.
- Committee for the Security of Sea Operations (or Offshore Committee): established in 2015 as the application of the EU Directive 2013/30, it provides regulations, evaluations and reports regarding major risks and oversees operators in the field of its competence. The Committee cooperates with competent authorities belonging to the EU countries.
- Independent Valuation Body (Organismo indipendente di valutazione, OIV): established in 2009, it monitors the whole function of the evaluation system, the transparency and integrity of internal controls and it elaborates an annual report about the leading directors of the Ministry. OIV ensures the application of guidelines proved by the National Anti-corruption Authority and the Public Function Department.
- Observatory for Local Public Services: established in 2013, it provides complete, clear and updated informations about the organization and management of economic local public services (urban waste management, water supply and public transport in particular).
- Council for the Postage Stamp Issue and Philately: it participates to the elaboration of the program on the issue of postage stamps by competent institutional bodies and relative policies.
- Study Commission of Postage Stamps: it analyses drafts of postal stamps created by the Istituto Poligrafico e Zecca dello Stato and expresses opinions on the graphic layout and the technical characteristics of new stamps.

== See also ==
- Ministry of Economy and Finance (Italy)
- Economy of Italy
