= Artificial intelligence industry in India =

The artificial intelligence (AI) market in India is projected to reach $8 billion by 2025, growing at 40% CAGR from 2020 to 2025. This growth is part of the broader AI boom, a global period of rapid technological advancements with India being pioneer starting in the early 2010s with NLP based Chatbots from Haptik, Corover.ai, Niki.ai and then gaining prominence in the early 2020s based on reinforcement learning, marked by breakthroughs such as generative AI models from Krutrim, Sarvam, Bintex AI, CoRover. India has many AI Hardware startups, AI Datacenter, Supercomputing and HPC companies such as Netweb Technologies. In India, the development of AI has been similarly transformative, with applications in healthcare, finance, and education, bolstered by government initiatives like NITI Aayog's 2018 National Strategy for Artificial Intelligence. Institutions such as the Indian Statistical Institute and the Indian Institute of Science published breakthrough AI research papers and patents.

India's transformation to AI is primarily being driven by startups and government initiatives & policies like Digital India. By fostering technological trust through digital public infrastructure, India is tackling socioeconomic issues by taking a bottom-up approach to AI. NASSCOM and Boston Consulting Group estimate that by 2027, India's AI services might be valued at $17 billion. According to 2025 Technology and Innovation Report, by UN Trade and Development, India ranks 10th globally for private sector investments in AI. According to Mary Meeker, India has emerged as a key market for AI platforms, accounting for the largest share of ChatGPT's mobile app users and having the third-largest user base for DeepSeek in 2025.

While AI presents significant opportunities for economic growth and social development in India, challenges such as data privacy concerns, skill shortages, and ethical considerations need to be addressed for responsible AI deployment. The growth of AI in India has also led to an increase in the number of cyberattacks that use AI to target organizations. In the 2026 Global Index on Responsible AI, India scored 41.77 which ranked 46th of 135 countries and ahead of 66% of those assessed, 8.8 points above the Asia and Oceania average (33.0) and 14.8 points above the lower-middle-income average (27.0).

== History ==
=== Early days (1960s-1980s) ===
The TIFRAC (Tata Institute of Fundamental Research Automatic Calculator) was designed and developed by a team led by Rangaswamy Narasimhan between 1954 and 1960. He worked on pattern recognition from 1961 to 1964 at the University of Illinois Urbana-Champaign's Digital Computer Laboratory. In order to conduct research on database technology, computer networking, computer graphics, and systems software, he and M. G. K. Menon founded the National Centre for Software Development and Computing Techniques. In 1965, he established the Computer Society of India and supervised the initial research work on AI at Tata Institute of Fundamental Research. Jagdish Lal launched the first computer science program in 1976 at Motilal Nehru Regional Engineering College. H. K. Kesavan from the University of Waterloo and Vaidyeswaran Rajaraman from the University of Wisconsin–Madison joined the IIT Kanpur Electrical Engineering Department in 1963–1964 as Assistant Professor and Head of Department, respectively. H.N. Mahabala, who was employed at Bendix Corporation's Computer Division, joined the department in 1965. He previously worked with Marvin Minsky. The IIT Kanpur Computer Center was led by H. K. Kesavan, with Vaidyeswaran Rajaraman serving as his deputy. Kesavan informally permitted Rajaraman and Mahabala to introduce artificial intelligence into computer science classes. The computer science program was approved by IIT Kanpur in 1971 and split out from the electrical engineering department. In 1973, an IBM System/370 Model 155 was installed at IIT Madras. John McCarthy, head of the Artificial Intelligence Laboratory at Stanford University visited IIT Kanpur in 1971. He donated PDP-1 with a time-sharing operating system. During the 1970s, the balance of payments deficit in India restricted import of computers. The Department of Computer Science and Automation at the Indian Institute of Science established in 1969, played an important role in nurturing the development of data science and artificial intelligence in India. First course on AI was introduced in the 1970s by G. Krishna. B. L. Deekshatulu introduced the first course on pattern recognition in the early 1970s.

=== Foundation phase ===
==== 1980s ====
In the 1980s, the Indian Statistical Institute's Optical Character Recognition Project was one of the country's first attempts at studying artificial intelligence and machine learning. OCR technology has benefited greatly from the work of ISI's Computer Vision and Pattern Recognition Unit, which is headed by Bidyut Baran Chaudhuri. He also contributed in the development of computer vision and digital image processing. As part of the Indian Fifth Generation Computer Systems Research Programme, the Department of Electronics, with support from the United Nations Development Programme, initiated the Knowledge Based Computer Systems Project in 1986, marking the beginning of India's first major AI research program. Prime Minister Rajiv Gandhi requested that the Department of Electronics and IISc to initiate the Parallel Processing Project in 1986–1987. The Center for Development of Advanced Computing eventually joined those efforts. IIT Madras was selected to develop system diagnosis, ISI for image processing, National Centre for Software Technology for natural language processing and TIFR for speech processing.

In 1987, the proposal of N. Seshagiri, Director General of the National Informatics Centre for the prototype development of supercomputer was cleared. Negotiations for a Cray supercomputer were underway between the Reagan administration and the Rajiv Gandhi government. US Defense Secretaries Frank Carlucci and Caspar Weinberger visited New Delhi after the US approved the transfer in 1988. The sale of a lower-end XMP-14 supercomputer was permitted in lieu of the Cray XMP-24 supercomputer due to security concerns. The Center for Development of Advanced Computing was formally established in March 1988 by the Ministry of Communications and Information Technology (previously the Ministry of IT) within the Department of Information Technology (formerly the Department of Electronics) in response to a recommendation made to the Prime Minister by the Scientific Advisory Council. The National Initiative in Supercomputing, which produced the PARAM series, was led by Vijay P. Bhatkar. For the first ten years, supercomputing and Indian language computing were the two main focus areas. C-DAC has expanded its operations in order to meet the needs in a number of domains, including network and internet software, real-time systems, artificial intelligence, and NLP.

Under the direction of Professor KV Ramakrishnamacharyulu from National Sanskrit University and Professor Rajeev Sangal from the International Institute of Information Technology, Hyderabad, the Akshar Bharati Research Group was established in 1984 with support from IIT Kanpur and the University of Hyderabad for computational processing of Indian languages. They focused on computational linguistics, NLP with ontological database systems, and Indian language/translation theories with linguistic tradition.

==== 1990s ====
From IIT Kanpur, Mohan Tambe joined C-DAC in the 1990s to work on Graphics and Intelligence based Script Technology (GIST), which addressed the challenge of adapting personal computer software based on Latin script to Devanagiri and a number of other Indian language scripts. He was previously working on the Machine Translation for Indian languages Project. Within C-DAC, he established the GIST group. The technology was expanded to encompass NLP, artificial intelligence-based machine-aided language learning and translation, multimedia and multilingual computing solutions, and more. GIST resulted in the creation of G-CLASS (GIST cross language search plug-ins suite), a cross-language search engine. The Applied Artificial Intelligence Group at C-DAC has developed some basic and novel applications in the field of NLP, including machine translation, information extraction/retrieval, automatic summarization, speech recognition, text-to-speech synthesis, intelligent language teaching, and natural language-based document management with Decision Support Systems. These applications are the result of the foundation laid by previous language technology activities. Software firms in the Indian private sector began looking into AI applications, mostly in the area of business process automation.

In order to allow machines to read, comprehend, and interpret human languages, the Language Technologies Research Center was founded in October 1999 at the International Institute of Information Technology, Hyderabad. It focused on the advancements in semantic parsing, information extraction, natural language generation, sentiment analysis, and dialogue systems.

Some of the early AI research in India was driven by societal needs. For example;

- Eklavya, a knowledge-based program created by IIT Madas, helped community health workers deal with toddler illness symptoms by generating systematic case histories, offering basic treatment advice, or indicating when a referral was necessary.
- The National Centre for Software Technology (NCST) created the Vidya language teaching system, which enhances educational quality through the use of speech-vision processing, ML, and NLP.
- C-DAC created the Sarani flight-scheduling expert system.
- TIFR and the Central Electronics Engineering Research Institute created a formant-based speech synthesis system for the Indian Railways.
- IISc and ISRO built an image processing facility that uses AI and computer vision.

=== Growth phase ===
Around 2003, language technology, computer vision, and data science research groups were established at the International Institute of Information Technology, Hyderabad. With an emphasis on applied and translational research, the institute has the largest group of AI and machine learning researchers in India as of 2023. They also work on blockchain and quantum computing. In partnership with Intel, they created the Indian Driving Dataset, which contains the largest amount of road data for unstructured driving situations worldwide.

The Government of Karnataka established the Machine Intelligence & Robotics CoE (MINRO) at the International Institute of Information Technology, Bengaluru in 2018 with the goal of creating frameworks and regulations for ethical and responsible AI technologies. It researches on human-machine interface, industrial robotics and automation, data science and analysis, pattern recognition, machine intelligence, and AI systems.

On 7 September 2018, NITI Aayog, Intel, and TIFR announced their intention to establish International Center for Transformative Artificial Intelligence (ICTAI) in Bengaluru to support applied research. Under the National Strategy for Artificial Intelligence, it will create and implement AI-led application-based research projects on AI foundational frameworks, tools, and assets, such as curated datasets and distinctive AI algorithms in smart mobility, healthcare, and agriculture. On 16 November 2018, the Government of Maharastra signed MoU with the NITI Aayog and Wadhwani Institute for Artificial Intelligence to launch ICTAI for rural healthcare in collaboration with PATH, Lords Education and Health Society, Wadhwani Initiative for Sustainable Healthcare, IIT Madras, Sir Ratan Tata Trust, and Stanford Center for Population Health Sciences. It will prioritize study, diagnosis, and treatment of illnesses such as tuberculosis and cancer.

NITI Aayog signed partnership agreement with Microsoft in 2018 to help expedite the use of AI for the development and adoption of local language computing, and to create farm advice services. Microsoft-NITI Aayog Problem to Solution Incubation Test Bed will be established. Microsoft will also help develop AI-assisted models for diabetic retinopathy screening.

NITI Aayog drafted a proposal in 2019 to establish an institutional framework for AI. A cabinet note has been issued proposing to allocate ₹7,500 crore initially over three years for the establishment of 20 AI adaption centers, five core research institutes, and a cloud computing platform named AIRAWAT.

=== Acceleration phase ===
INDIAai, a collaborative initiative of the National E-Government Division and NASSCOM for AI-related advancements, was introduced by Ravi Shankar Prasad on 30 May 2020. In partnership with Intel and the Ministry of Education, the Responsible AI for Youth Program was also introduced to foster the development of AI-related skills. The Yardi School of Artificial Intelligence was founded in September 2020 by IIT Delhi to advance research in AI, ML, and data science in the fields of healthcare, materials science, robotics, industry 4.0, weather prediction, and transportation. $10 million was contributed by Yardi Systems' Anant Yardi in 2021 for education, infrastructure and research related activities. Sharad Kumar Saraf and Sudarshan Kumar Saraf, the founders of Technocraft Industries, donated ₹15 crore to establish the Technocraft Centre for Applied Artificial Intelligence at IIT Bombay in March 2021. In 2021, the Mehta Family Foundation and IIT Guwahati signed an MoU to establish the Mehta Family School of Data Science and Artificial Intelligence.

According to Stanford University's annual AI Index report, India ranked fifth globally in 2022 in terms of investments received by businesses offering AI products and services. In 2022, Indian software professionals made the most global contribution to nearly 24% of GitHub projects pertaining to AI.

The Centre for Machine Intelligence and Data Science was officially opened by IIT Bombay on 28 April 2023. The National Research Foundation was created to advance research in a variety of fields, including AI with a budget of ₹50,000 crore for five years.

The Union Cabinet approved an extension of the Digital India program in 2023, allocating ₹14,903 crore starting FY2021-22 to FY2025-26 for the addition of nine new supercomputers under the National Super Computer Mission. All 22 of the Schedule 8 languages will be available for Bhashini. There will be the establishment of three AI Centers of Excellence focused on sustainable cities, agriculture, and health. Prime Minister Narendra Modi addressed international concerns about the negative use of artificial intelligence during a virtual G20 conference hosted by India in November 2023.

To assist the Indian government and policymakers on data science and AI-related policy issues, Sunil Wadhwani gave ₹110 crore to IIT Madras in 2024 for Wadhwani School of Data Science and AI. The institute will combine fundamental and applied research in systems biology, manufacturing, energy and the environment, healthcare, agriculture, smart cities and transportation, financial analytics, and defense.

India invested ₹10,371.92 crore (US$1.1 billion) on IndiaAI Mission. With a budget of ₹990 crore, Minister for Education Dharmendra Pradhan announced on 15 October 2024, the creation of three AI Centers of Excellence in New Delhi: one for agricultural (under IIT Ropar), one for sustainable cities (under IIT Kanpur), and one for healthcare (under AIIMS and IIT Delhi). The Center for Generative AI, Shrijan at IIT Jodhpur was established on 25 October 2024 by Meta Platforms and IndiaAI to support long-term sustainability of Foundation Models and GenAI research in healthcare, education, agriculture, smart cities, smart mobility, sustainability, financial inclusion, and social inclusion. Additionally, the YuvAI initiative for Skilling and Capacity Building was launched in collaboration with the All India Council for Technical Education to advance open-source AI. Meta has pledged to donate up to ₹750 lakhs over a three-year period. Gati Shakti Vishwavidyalaya, the Institute of Human Behavior and Allied Sciences, the Postgraduate Institute of Medical Education and Research, and the All India Institute of Medical Sciences, Jodhpur, will work together with Shrijan. In November 2024, the Karnataka government approved a ₹28 crore investment to construct a Center of Excellence in Artificial Intelligence in Bengaluru.

From 2025 to 2027, Microsoft to invest ₹25,000 crore (US$2.7 billion) on cloud and AI infrastructure. The construction of a 3 GW data center for AI services in Jamnagar was announced by Reliance Industries in 2025. On 12 June 2025, India's first locally developed, multilingual agentic AI, Kruti, was introduced by Ola Krutrim.

== AI companies of India ==
The following is a list of notable AI companies of India, along with their corporate headquarters location.

Name	Headquarters	AI field	Founded year
Aeroflex Industries	Navi Mumbai	AI Datacenter cooling solutions	1993
Amagi Media Labs	Bangalore	Cloud/AI	2008 in Bangalore
Bharat Electronics	Bangalore	AI Warfare systems i.e. Akashteer	1954
Capillary Technologies	Bengaluru	AI marketing intelligence	2008
ESDS Software	Nashik	AI-based Datacenter control & monitoring, Cloud storage using AI	2005
Fractal Analytics	Mumbai	Data analytics	2000 in Mumbai
Glance	Bengaluru	Social media	2019
Haptik	Mumbai	Chatbot, intelligence assistant	2013 in Mumbai
Ittiam Systems	Bengaluru	Video/Audio codec optimization using AI	2001
Infibeam Avenues	GIFT City	Fraud detection and authentication and risk identification in financial & commerce sector	2010
Netweb Technologies	Faridabad	AI Datacenter and Supercomputer manufacturing	1999
kFin Technologies	Hyderabad	Insurance	2017
Orient Technologies	Mumbai	AI Datacenter Infrastructure monitoring	1997
Ola Krutrim	Bangalore	Agentic AI and chatbots	2023
Niki.ai	Bengaluru	Chatbots	2015
Persistent Systems	Pune	Data analytics	1990
SigTuple	Bangalore	AI based medical devices	2015
Protean eGov Technologies	Mumbai	AI-driven biometric	1995
Tata Technologies	Pune	AI-driven Robotics and AI/ML-based manufacturing R&D	1989
Uniphore Software Systems	Palo Alto, California	Conversational automation	2008 in Chennai, India
Qubo.ai	New Delhi	AI based smart camera	2018 as a part of Hero Group
Yellow.ai	San Mateo, California	Messenger	2016 in Bangalore, India
Zoho Corporation	Chennai	General AI	1996 in New Jersey, USA
KissanAI	Surat	Agriculture	2023
Sarvam AI	Bengaluru	Generative AI, large language models	2023
Bintex AI	Biharsharif	Indian Artificial Intelligence and Chatbot	2026
AAGYAVISION	Bengaluru	Custom-designed chip, radar hardware, and AI-powered algorithms for real-time control and signal analysis	2022
NxtGen Cloud Technologies	Bengaluru	Agentic and generative AI, sovereign cloud	2012

== National Mission on Interdisciplinary Cyber-Physical Systems ==
The mission which has a five-year budget of ₹3,660 crore, was authorized by the Union Cabinet in December 2018 under the Department of Science and Technology. A technological vertical in AI and ML, IoT, data bank and DaaS, data analysis, autonomous systems and robotics, cyber security, and quantum engineering has been assigned to each of the 25 technological innovation hubs that have been formed.

To translate academic research on AI at the proof-of-concept stage into commercially viable goods and services, IIT Kharagpur established the AI4ICPS Innovation Hub Foundation in 2020. Under the National Mission on Interdisciplinary Cyber-Physical Systems (NM-ICPS), the Department of Science and Technology awarded it a grant of ₹170 crore.

With a seed money of ₹230 crore from the Department of Science and Technology and the Government of Karnataka, an Artificial Intelligence and Robotics Technology Park was established at the Indian Institute of Science as not-for-profit foundation in November 2020 for mission-mode research and development projects in cyber-security, healthcare, education, mobility, infrastructure, agriculture, and retail.

TiHAN at IIT Hyderabad hosted India's first Autonomous Navigations Testbed Facility (Aerial & Terrestrial) in 2022, which was opened by Jitendra Singh Rana from Ministry of Science and Technology to develop next-generation autonomous navigation technology.

To develop spectral and energy-efficient wireless communications technology for 5G and 5G-Advanced, Kiran Kumar Kuchi of IIT Hyderabad and IIITB Comet Foundation in 2024 developed an O-RAN base station solution that triples capacity and improves cell coverage when compared to 4G networks.

Technology Innovation Hubs

Name	Location	Area of research
AI4ICPS I-Hub Foundation	IIT Kharagpur	Artificial Intelligence and Machine Learning
TIH Foundation for IoT and IoE	IIT Bombay	Internet of things & Internet of everything
IIIT-H Data I-Hub Foundation	International Institute of Information Technology, Hyderabad	Data Banks & Data Services, Data Analysis
I-HUB for Robotics and Autonomous Systems Innovation Foundation	Indian Institute of Science, Bengaluru	Robotics & Autonomous Systems
IHUB NTIHAC Foundation	IIT Kanpur	Cyber Security and Cyber Security for Physical Infrastructure
IHUB Drishti Foundation	IIT Jodhpur	Computer vision, Augmented and virtual reality
Divyasampark IHUB Roorkee for Devices Materials and Technology Foundation	IIT Roorkee	Device Technology and Materials
IIT Patna Vishlesan I-hub Foundation	IIT Patna	Speech, Video & Text Analytics
IIT Madras Pravartak Technologies Foundation	IIT Madras	Sensors, Networking, Actuator & controls
NMICPS Technology Innovation Hub on Autonomous Navigation Foundation (TiHAN)	IIT Hyderabad	Autonomous Navigation and Data Acquisition systems
I-DAPT-HUB Foundation	IIT (BHU) Varanasi	Data Analytics & Predictive Technologies
IIT Guwahati Technology Innovation and Development Foundation	IIT Guwahati	Technologies for underwater exploration
IIT Mandi I-Hub and HCI Foundation	IIT Mandi	Human–computer interaction
I-Hub Foundation for Cobotics	IIT Delhi	Collaborative robotics
IIT Ropar Technology and Innovation Foundation	IIT Ropar	Technologies for agriculture & water.
Technology Innovation in Exploration & Mining Foundation	IIT (ISM) Dhanbad	Technologies for mining
IIT Palakkad Technology I-Hub Foundation	IIT Palakkad	Intelligent collaborative systems
IIITB Comet Foundation	International Institute of Information Technology, Bengaluru	Advanced communication system
BITS BioCYTiH Foundation	BITS Pilani	Bio-Cyber-Physical Systems
IDEAS- Institute of Data Engineering, Analytics and Science Foundation	Indian Statistical Institute, Kolkata	Data Science, Big Data Analytics and Data curation
IITI Drishti CPS Foundation	IIT Indore	System Simulation, Modelling & Visualization
IHUB Anubhuti-IIITD Foundation	Indraprastha Institute of Information Technology, Delhi	Cognitive Computing & Social Sensing
I-Hub Quantum Technology Foundation	Indian Institute of Science Education and Research, Pune	Quantum technologies
IIT Tirupati Navavishkar I-Hub Foundation	IIT Tirupati	Positioning & Precision Technologies
IIT Bhilai Innovation and Technology Foundation	IIT Bhilai	Fintech

== Legislation ==
India currently does not have specific laws regulating artificial intelligence (AI). However, the Indian government has introduced several initiatives and guidelines aimed at the responsible development and deployment of AI technologies. The Indian government has tasked NITI Aayog, its apex public policy think tank, with establishing guidelines and policies for AI. In 2018, NITI Aayog released the National Strategy for Artificial Intelligence, also known as #AIForAll, which focuses on healthcare, agriculture, education, smart cities, and smart mobility.

In 2021, NITI Aayog published the "Principles for Responsible AI," addressing ethical considerations for AI deployment in India. These principles cover system considerations, such as decision-making and accountability, and societal considerations, such as the impact of automation on employment. The second part of this document, "Operationalizing Principles for Responsible AI," released in August 2021, focuses on implementing these ethical principles through regulatory and policy interventions, capacity building, and incentivizing ethical practices.

In 2023, the Indian government enacted the Digital Personal Data Protection Act, which addresses some privacy concerns related to AI platforms. The Ministry of Electronics and Information Technology (MeitY) has also issued advisories requiring platforms to obtain explicit permission before deploying unreliable AI models and to label AI-generated content to prevent misuse. India is a member of the Global Partnership on Artificial Intelligence (GPAI), which promotes the responsible use of AI through international collaboration. In 2023, the GPAI Summit was held in New Delhi, where experts discussed responsible AI, data governance, and the future of work.

Other Indian agencies, such as the Bureau of Indian Standards (BIS), are also working on AI policies. BIS has established a committee to propose draft standards for AI, focusing on safety, reliability, and ethical considerations. India has not yet enacted specific AI regulations. However, the government has introduced measures to promote innovation and address ethical concerns and risks associated with AI. These efforts aim to support the growth of India's AI ecosystem and ensure responsible AI deployment.

== Bharat GPT initiative ==
The Bharat GPT is a non-profit initiative, started in February 2023. The goal is to develop India focused multilingual, multimodal large language models and generative pre-trained transformer. Together with the applications and implementation frameworks, the Bharat GPT Consortium intends to publish a series of foundation models in order to meet the needs of developers and businesses. The Bharat GPT Consortium was established in 2022 under the public-private partnership with IIT Bombay, Jio Platforms, NASSCOM, Seetha Mahalaxmi Healthcare, Digital India Bhashini Division (Ministry of Electronics and Information Technology), IIT Madras, IIT Mandi, IIT Hyderabad, IIT Kanpur, International Institute of Information Technology, Hyderabad, and Indian Institute of Management Indore as members.

The Bharat GPT development team is led by Professor Ganesh Ramakrishnan of IIT Bombay as principal investigator, with support from Professor Mohan Raghavan and Professor Maunendra Sankar Desarkar of IIT Hyderabad, Professor Rohit Saluja of IIT Mandi, Professor V Kamakoti of IIT Madras, Professor Arnab Bhattacharya of IIT Kanpur, Professor Kshitij Jadhav of IIT Bombay, Professor Aditya Maheshwari of IIM Indore, and Professor Ravi Kiran of IIIT-Hyderabad. The text-based foundation model will be released first, followed by speech and video models. In addition to licensing commercial use, the effort has been open-sourcing a large portion of its work. Bharat GPT is anticipated to be activated by speech and gesture recognition.

On 27 December 2023, Akash Ambani announced that Jio Platforms and IIT Bombay were collaborating on Bharat GPT program. Jio Platforms will assist Bharat GPT with specialized downstream telecom and retail applications by developing smaller, customized models. By investigating the potential of AI to foster innovation across a range of goods and services, Jio hopes to achieve its larger goal of establishing a whole ecosystem of growth through Bharat GPT. Bharat GPT Consortium is assisting in the interpretation of official documents, such as court orders, in close collaboration with the Department of Administrative Reforms and Public Grievances.

India's first ChatGPT-style service, will be launched in March 2024 by Bharat GPT Consortium, with assistance from the Department of Science and Technology, and Reliance Industries. The four primary areas in which Bharat GPT sees its model operating are healthcare, financial services, governance, and education, supporting 11 Indian languages.

=== Hanooman series ===
Seetha Mahalaxmi Healthcare (SML) revealed the Hanooman series LLM in February 2024 in collaboration with the Bharat GPT Consortium. Among the Hanooman series, the first four AI models—1.5 billion, 7 billion, 13 billion, and 40 billion parameters in size—will be made available as open-source after being trained on 22 Indian languages. The ability to generate text-to-text, text-to-video, speech synthesis and speech recognition will be aided by Hanooman's multimodal learning capability. SML is negotiating with healthcare organizations, BFSI, and mobile app developers to create customized models by refining the Hanooman series. The healthcare model VizzhyGPT is the first of these refined iterations, having been trained on extensive multiomics, clinical research, and electronic health record data.

Hanooman's alpha version, which lacks multimodal features and internet access, was launched on 10 May 2024, in 98 international languages, including 12 Indian languages (Hindi, Marathi, Gujarati, Bengali, Kannada, Odia, Punjabi, Assamese, Tamil, Telugu, Malayalam, and Sindhi). It enables tutoring, coding, and conversation. The platform is collaborating with NASSCOM, Hewlett-Packard, and the Government of Telangana. Yotta Infrastructure will supply GPU cloud infrastructure. As of 14 May 2024, the Hanooman chatbot is accessible via both a web-client and an Android application.

Hanooman is jointly owned by SML and 3AI Holding Limited, an AI investment company based in Abu Dhabi. Both businesses will own 50% share under joint ownership arrangement. In order to improve Hanooman's text, voice, image, and coding capabilities for users, it will be able to access 3AI Holding's Omega GenAI, which is being created with 665 billion parameters and 20 trillion tokens. For business clients, Hanooman will launch a proprietary model.

== BharatGen ==
BharatGen, formerly known as BharatGPT, is an Indian government-funded artificial intelligence project focused on developing India-centric foundation models. The project was proposed by IIT Bombay professor Ganesh Ramakrishnan and is intended to support generative AI systems that account for India's linguistic and cultural diversity. BharatGen was formally introduced on 30 September 2024 as an open-source, multimodal and multilingual initiative. The Department of Science and Technology is funding the project with an allocation of less than ₹235 crore (equivalent to ₹250 crore or US$27 million in 2026) under the National Mission on Interdisciplinary Cyber-Physical Systems. The project also seeks to develop domestically controlled AI systems for applications where reliance on foreign models may raise security or data-governance concerns. Ramakrishnan had previously advocated a public–private partnership for AI development through the BharatGPT programme, elements of which were subsequently incorporated into BharatGen. The project was scheduled for completion by 2026.

BharatGen is organized as a national programme involving multiple government ministries and research institutions. Its models and associated intellectual property are intended to be developed and retained in India. Computing resources for the programme are provided through the IndiaAI Compute Facility, while Yotta Infrastructure and Neysa provide cloud computing support. Academic institutions and faculty members also participate in research and development under the programme.

The BharatGen consortium develops the project's models and supporting technical infrastructure. As of February 2025, it included about 50–60 researchers as well as student contributors from the Indian Institute of Management Indore, the International Institute of Information Technology, Hyderabad, IIT Bombay, IIT Kanpur, IIT Hyderabad, IIT Mandi, and IIT Madras. The consortium also includes researchers and specialists from fields including behavioral economics, engineering, artificial intelligence and design. Participating institutions work on models for speech, language and vision. The project is intended to cover languages and writing systems used in India, including languages that have relatively limited representation in existing AI training datasets.

On 30 January 2025, Minister of Electronics and Information Technology Ashwini Vaishnaw said that the framework for the AI model had been completed and that development had been underway for approximately one and a half years. According to Vaishnaw, an initial version was expected within four to ten months.

BharatGen also established the Bharat Data Sagar initiative, a multilingual data repository for AI research. The repository is intended to collect data for Indian languages that are underrepresented in existing corpora, including material reflecting regional languages, dialects and cultural contexts. Data from the initiative is intended for use in training and adapting language and multimodal models. BharatGen also develops tools for translation and for generating content in regional languages and dialects.

In October 2024, BharatGen launched e-vikrAI, an e-commerce application based on vision-language models. The system generates product catalogue information from images supplied by sellers, including titles, descriptions, product features and suggested prices. It can also translate product descriptions into Indian languages and provide spoken versions of the generated text.

== IndiaAI Mission and compute facility ==
The IndiaAI Mission was approved on 7 March 2024 consisting of seven core pillars, and an allocation of ₹10,371.92 crore (US$1.1 billion) across various components as follows:

Core pillars	Fund allocation for 2024-2029
IndiaAI Compute	₹4,563.36 crore (US$490 million)
IndiaAI Datasets Platform	₹199.55 crore (US$21 million)
IndiaAI Application Development Initiatives	₹689.05 crore (US$74 million)
IndiaAI FutureSkills	₹882.94 crore (US$94 million)
IndiaAI Innovation Center	₹1,971.37 crore (US$210 million)
IndiaAI Startup Financing	₹1,942.5 crore (US$210 million)
Safe & Trusted AI	₹20.46 crore (US$2.2 million)

Additionally, IndiaAI Overheads and Contingency received funding of ₹102.69 crore (US$11 million). The digital public infrastructure framework for AI in India guarantees consent-based, ethically generated datasets while lowering dependency on foreign and synthetic data.

On 30 January 2025, Ashwini Vaishnaw, the Minister for Electronics and information Technology, confirmed that the IndiaAI Mission would customize native AI solutions for the Indian context using Indian languages, supported by a state-of-the-art shared computing infrastructure. The initial AI model starts with a compute capacity of about 10,000 GPUs, with the remaining 8693 GPUs to be added shortly. The facility includes 7,200 AMD Instinct MI200 and MI300 series, 12,896 Nvidia H100, and 1,480 H200 processors. The cost of computing the AI model will be less than ₹100 per hour following a 40% government subsidy, with half-yearly and annual plans for developers, researchers, and students.

Startups, MSMEs, universities, researchers, students, and governmental organizations will all be able to access AI compute, network, storage, platform, and cloud services through the IndiaAI Compute Portal. Easy access to Nvidia H100, H200, A100, L40S, and L4, AMD MI300x and 325X, Intel Gaudi 2, AWS Trainium, and Inferentia will be made possible by the portal. Nearly 45% of the IndiaAI Mission's budget goes into the AI Compute Portal.

Accessing more expensive GPUs would cost ₹150 per hour, while utilizing less expensive GPUs would cost ₹115.85 per hour. Orient Technologies, CMS Computers Limited, SHI Locuz, CtrlS, NxtGen Cloud Technologies, Yotta Infrastructure, Jio Platforms, Tata Communications, E2E Networks, and Vensysco Technologies have been approved by the government to provide 18,693 GPUs.

As part of the IndianAI Mission, the union government, in April 2025, selected Sarvam AI, to develop the country's first sovereign LLM, which will include the capabilities of reasoning, voice, and fluency in Indian languages. As of May 2025, the government, as part of the IndianAI Mission, is supporting Indian researchers in designing indigenous GPUs.

Ashwini Vaishnaw announced AIKosha: IndiaAI Datasets Platform, the AI Compute Portal, the AI Competency Framework for Public Sector Officials, iGOT-AI Mission Karmayogi, the IndiaAI Startups Global Acceleration Program with Station F, the IndiaAI Application Development Initiative, and IndiaAI FutureSkills on 6 March 2025, as part of the IndiaAI Mission to strengthen AI-driven research, innovation, and skill development. For public officials, the iGOT-AI Mission Karmayogi incorporates AI-driven learning recommendations.

AIKosha: IndiaAI Datasets Platform

To facilitate AI innovation, AIKosha will offer a safe, centralized platform with easy access to a database of models, use cases, and datasets. Through an integrated development environment, tools, and tutorials, it offers AI sandbox capabilities. AIKosha has features like permission-based access, content discoverability, AI readiness scoring of datasets, and security methods including secure APIs, firewalls for real-time harmful traffic filtering, and data encryption both in motion and at rest. More than 80 models and 300 datasets are available on AIKosha. Both the public and private sector organizations gather AIKosha datasets, which include census data, geospatial data, and linguistic data.

IndiaAI Startups Global Acceleration Program

The IndiaAI Mission will begin a four-month acceleration program in partnership with Station F and HEC Paris from 2025. The ten shortlisted AI startup companies will have access to networking opportunities, mentorship, and international market expansion in Europe.

=== AI Research Analytics and Knowledge Dissemination Platform ===
With a peak performance of 13,170 teraflops, AIRAWAT-PSAI is the biggest and fastest AI supercomputing machine in India. It was deployed at C-DAC, Pune in 2023 and is maintained by Netweb Technologies.

MeitY is also funding the implementation of 200 AI Petaflops Mixed Precision peak computing capacity (scalable to 790 AI Petaflops) Proof of Concept for AI Research Analytics and Knowledge Dissemination Platform (AIRAWAT), which is being carried out by C-DAC, Pune. A combined peak compute of 410 AI Petaflops Mixed Precision and a sustained compute capability of 8.5 Petaflops (Rmax) Double Precision are achieved by combining the 200 AI Petaflop AIRAWAT PoC with the 210 AI Petaflop PARAM Siddhi-AI. 13 Petaflops is the maximum computation capacity (Double Precision, Rpeak). A plan for expanding AIRAWAT to 1,000 AI Petaflops of Mixed Precision computing capacity has been envisioned by MeitY. With its extensive, power-optimized AI cloud infrastructure, AIRAWAT will serve as a common computational cloud platform for Big Data Analytics and Assimilation, linking all Centers for Research Excellence in Artificial Intelligence (COREs), Indian Centres for Transformational AI (ICTAIs), and other academic, research lab, scientific community, industry, and start-up institutions with the National Knowledge Network.

With an emphasis on NLP, surveillance and image processing, pattern recognition, medical imaging, education, agriculture, finance, healthcare, audio assistance, robotics, national security, defense, the automotive industry, supply chain management, human resource development, and anomalous behavior detection from video analytics, AIRAWAT will support the field of applied AI. Deployed under the National Supercomputing Mission, it will support the Digital India Bhashini initiative and accomplish the goals of the National Program on AI.

== International collaboration ==
Prime Minister Narendra Modi with NITI Aayog officially opened the World Economic Forum's Center for the Fourth Industrial Revolution liaison office in Navi Mumbai on 11 October 2018. Its objective is to foster the responsible adoption and deployment of new technologies by designing policy frameworks and protocols with the government, corporations, academic institutions, startups, and international organizations. The Indian team will collaborate with their counterparts in Beijing, Tokyo, and San Francisco to focus on blockchain & DLT, AI & ML. To increase farmers' incomes, C4IR has been working on AI-driven agricultural initiatives since 2018. In January 2024, C4IR, MeitY, NASSCOM, and the Office of the Principal Scientific Adviser launched the AI for India 2030 initiative. Its goal is to offer a systematic approach to the ethical, inclusive, and responsible adoption of AI in India.

India's Ministry of Electronics and Information Technology and Japan's Ministry of Economy, Trade, and Industry signed a memorandum of cooperation on 29 October 2018, which outlines the two nations' cooperation in AI and IoT as part of India-Japan Cooperation on Digital Partnership. In an effort to strengthen ties between NITI Aayog and METI, India and Japan signed a broad statement of intent on AI under "Society 5.0" that included the exploration of potential institutional collaborations, such as joint projects between IIT Hyderabad and Artificial Intelligence Research Centre (National Institute of Advanced Industrial Science and Technology), related to machine learning, deep learning, data mining, and other AI themes. Joint scientific and technological cooperation in ML, and probabilistic logic techniques for various data types and combinations were added to the extended MoU on 24 December 2021.

In 2021, the Indian Department of Science and Technology and the United States Department of State were designated as the nodal agencies for the US India Artificial Intelligence Initiative launched under Indo-US Science and Technology Forum. It will provide a forum for bilateral research and development cooperation. It will also facilitate AI innovation, exchange ideas for building an AI workforce, and suggest ways to promote collaborations.

The United States and India expanded their joint cyber training and exercises in 2022 and initiated the Defense Artificial Intelligence Dialogue. According to Cleo Paskal, a non-resident senior fellow at the Foundation for Defense of Democracies, the Indian community has influenced AI research and development in the US for many years. Things are taken to the next level by the Defense Artificial Intelligence Dialogue. In the same year, the US intends to join six of India's Technology Innovation Hubs to support collaborative research projects in fields including AI, advanced wireless technologies, and data science to further advancements in applications like agriculture, health, and climate. Thirty-five projects have been selected for implementation by the DST and U.S. National Science Foundation.

As part of the United States–India Initiative on Critical and Emerging Technology, the US and India announced setting aside more than $2 million in 2024 for collaborative research initiatives that will advance AI and quantum technology.

In order to develop advanced driver-assistance systems and vehicular automation technologies that can be used in different parts of the world, the Japanese business Honda began collaborative research on AI technologies with IIT Delhi and IIT Bombay in 2024. This was done in order to further advance the company's own Honda Cooperative Intelligence AI platform.

To create safe, open, secure, and reliable AI, Prime Minister Narendra Modi and President Emmanuel Macron announced the India-France Roadmap on Artificial Intelligence on 12 February 2025. The goal is to make sure that the rules and guidelines governing the use of AI represent democratic principles and maximize its potential for the advancement of humanity and the common good.

The India-EU Trade and Technology Council has made AI a top priority. In 2025, the European AI Office and the India AI Mission agreed to strengthen collaboration on large language models, including collaborative efforts to create frameworks and tools for responsible and ethical AI. It will expand upon the advancements in high-performance computing applications related to bioinformatics, climate change, and natural disasters that have been made possible by collaborative research and development.

On 2 July 2025, the Government of Telangana launched the Telangana Data Exchange (TGDeX) in partnership with IISc and the Japan International Cooperation Agency. It will enable access to structured datasets and developer tools required to create AI solutions. TGDeX will utilize Open Data Telangana platform. TGDeX's goal of hosting more than 2,000 AI-ready datasets over the next five years will be aided by the Telangana AI Mission (T-AIM), T–Hub, MATH (AI/ML Centre of Excellence of T-Hub), IIT Hyderabad, and IIIT-Hyderabad. Launched in August 2025, the India-Japan AI Cooperation Initiative aims to advance strategic cooperation in AI through cooperative research, university-company partnerships, LLM development, and cooperation in building a reliable AI ecosystem.

== Impact ==
=== Agriculture ===
On 12 December 2023, KissanAI announced the release of Dhenu 1.0, world's first agriculture-specific LLM designed for Indian farmers. It can handle 300,000 instruction sets and understand English, Hindi, and Hinglish queries. The platform provides voice-based, tailored assistance. KissanAI used Sarvam AI's OpenHathi for bilingual support and worked with NimbleBox for APIs. Dhenu 1.0 utilizes OpenHermes 2.5 Mistral 7B. KissanAI is supported by Microsoft for Startups. For climate resilient agriculture practices, KissanAI partnered with the United Nations Development Programme in January 2024 to develop a voice-based vernacular GenAI virtual assistant. The main goals of this project are to overcome language barriers and offer easily comprehensible information so that female farmers can actively engage in and profit from generative AI developments. Dhenu2, an open-source version, was launched in October 2024, providing solutions for agribusinesses, farmers, and policymakers worldwide. It is available in three models: 8B, 3B, and 1B, and is powered by the Llama 3. The platform is based on 1.5 million synthetic and real-world instructions that cover more than 4,000 agricultural topics and categories. Over 100,000 farmers were interviewed to gain insights that provided practical information for better decision-making.

Uttar Pradesh Open Network for Agriculture, a digital public infrastructure, powered by Gemini and Beckn protocol, was launched in January 2025 by the Government of Uttar Pradesh in collaboration with Google Cloud Platform. Farmers will get one-stop access to market linkages, loans, mechanization, and advisory services for selling their produce. Voice user interface will be available to farmers in Hindi, Bengali, Telugu, Kannada, Gujarati, and Punjabi, with other Indian languages to be added in 2025.

IIT Indore established on 27 January 2025 AgriHub, a center of excellence for sustainable agriculture co-funded by the Ministry of Electronics and Information Technology (MeitY) and the Government of Madhya Pradesh. The center uses Artificial Intelligence, Machine Learning and Deep Learning technologies for agricultural research. The major areas of research include big data analysis, genomics research, precision agriculture, xerophytes and AI-based disease diagnostics

Farmers in Fazilka have embraced AI-powered weather sensors created by IIT Ropar. It provides real-time information on atmospheric conditions by utilizing data gathered from satellites, weather balloons and a network of weather stations on the ground. Parameters like temperature, humidity, precipitation, and lux are used with data from the India Meteorological Department to forecast rainfall.

AI is being used by the Ministry of Agriculture and Farmers' Welfare to assist farmers. An AI-powered chatbot called Kisan e-Mitra was built to help farmers with their questions on Pradhan Mantri Kisan Samman Nidhi scheme in multiple Indian languages. The National Pest Surveillance System uses AI and ML to identify pest infestation, allowing for prompt action for healthier crops and addressing the loss of produce brought on by climate change. AI-based analytics that use field photos to monitor and evaluate crop health utilizing weather, soil moisture, and satellite data for wheat and rice cultivation.

The use of AI in Khutbav village by the Agriculture Development Trust and Microsoft in 2025 led to a 40% increase in yield and a 50% reduction in production costs due to water and pesticide usage. Through a smartphone application Agripilot.ai developed by Click2Cloud, the AI notify farmers of possible pest attacks, soil conditions, air speed, and weather conditions to determine when to apply pesticides and how much water the crop requires. Utilizing a variety of data sources, including satellite imagery, weather forecasts, soil sensors, and inputs unique to each farm, the AI generate personalized suggestions for farmers. Microsoft's Azure Data Manager for Agriculture (formerly Microsoft FarmBeats), is used to process this data. The annual fee for AI services is ₹10,000. In order to offer insights, the data is analyzed by the open-source research project FarmVibes.ai in conjunction with historical crop data. For the farmer, Microsoft Azure OpenAI Service transforms these details into easy-to-follow steps.

In 100 villages, the Assam government will support the establishment of AI-powered agri-hubs, where drones and AI would assist farmers in making data-driven decisions, increasing yields, and promoting sustainability, according to the state budget for 2025–2026.

=== Industry ===
With an investment of ₹20 crore, Tata Consultancy Services founded the FC Kohli Centre on Intelligent Systems at International Institute of Information Technology, Hyderabad in 2015 to conduct research in the fields of robotics, cognitive sciences, neural language processing, and intelligent systems.

In March 2018, Capillary Technologies and IIT Kharagpur established the Centre of Excellence in Artificial Intelligence Research for financial analytics, industrial automation, digital healthcare, and intelligent transportation systems, with a combined investment of ₹56.4 million. By March 2019, a second campus at Kukatpallya will open. In July, the Karnataka government and NASSCOM jointly established the Center of Excellence for Data Science and Artificial Intelligence on a public–private partnership for helping small and medium enterprises and make big data sets for training models available.

For fundamental research in deep learning, reinforcement learning, network analytics, interpretable machine learning, and domain-aware AI, Bosch established the Robert Bosch Center for Data Science and Artificial Intelligence at IIT Madras in 2019. The center will concentrate its applied research on systems biology, smart cities, manufacturing analytics, financial analytics, and healthcare. Additionally, it is the location of India's largest deep reinforcement learning group. At the Microsoft Research Lab in Bengaluru, Microsoft introduced Societal Impact through Cloud and Artificial Intelligence in 2019 to use cloud computing and AI to address long-term societal issues in transportation, agriculture, health and wellness, and education.

Accenture opened its first Nano Lab in the Asia–Pacific on 4 February 2020, in Hyderabad, for applied research in security, extended reality, and AI. The Nvidia AI Technology Center was founded at IIT Hyderabad in 2020 with the goal of accelerating AI research and commercialization. It focuses on the application of AI in language comprehension, smart cities, and agriculture. Situational awareness, operator environment analysis, smart appliances, autonomous navigation systems, edge devices for IoT and industry 4.0, and conversational user interfaces were among the AI applications that Tata Elxsi's Artificial Intelligence Centre of Excellence began deploying in 2020. In 2020, Intel established INAI, an applied artificial intelligence research center in Hyderabad, in partnership with the Public Health Foundation of India, IIIT-H, and the Government of Telangana. INAI will focus on population-level issues in the smart mobility and healthcare sectors.

SiMa.ai established a new design center in Bengaluru in 2021 to work on the MLSoC platform, the first machine learning SoC specifically designed for the industry. This platform can support any framework, neural network, or foundational model for any workload.

In 2021, Kotak Mahindra Bank and IISc announced their intention to establish the Kotak-IISc AI-ML Center for research and innovation in fintech, as well as to cultivate the necessary talent pool to satisfy industry demands. Private businesses are attempting to create smaller, less expensive large language model. Examples of these include AI4Bharat's Airawat series, Sarvam AI's OpenHathi series, CoRover.ai's BharatGPT, Tech Mahindra's Indus project, Ola's Krutrim, TWO AI's Sutra series, and SML's series.

IIT Delhi's Yardi School of Artificial Intelligence and an Indian deep tech firm KnowDis are working together to create AI models that could find possible antibodies to treat a variety of illnesses. In part of its $1 billion pledge to accelerate AI-led innovation for the ai360 ecosystem, Wipro announced on 18 August 2023, the opening of a Center of Excellence in Generative Artificial Intelligence in collaboration with IIT Delhi. To study AI, the Adani Group and the International Holding Company established a joint venture on 28 December 2023.

On 29 August 2024, Mukesh Ambani revealed the creation of an application agnostic suite of tools and platforms called Jio Brain, to hasten the Reliance Group's adoption of AI and set the stage for 6G development with plans to offer services to vendors. JioBrain combines high speed and low latency of 5G with automation, anomaly detection, and predictive forecasting. Reliance intends to use it to optimize processes in education, healthcare, entertainment, retail, and agriculture. JioBrain includes over 500 REST APIs and data APIs. It can be used for NLP, image-to-video, text-to-music, text-to-image and video, speech-to-speech, speech-to-text translation, code generation, explanation, optimization, and debugging. Additionally, it contains feature engineering, model chaining, and hyperparameter optimization. Jio Brain offers mobile and enterprise-ready LLM-as-a-service capability for GenAI.

AI has been used in medical devices, medical reports, predicting advertising & marketing results, do product design & development, healthcare & cognitive testing with diagnostic AI. GenAI is being used by Indian brands for product ideation, visual concept development, social post creation.

In 2025, Citadel Securities and IIT Kanpur announced a collaboration to construct the Translational and Transformative Training and Investigations Laboratory, an advanced GPU research facility for work on machine learning, intelligent systems, data science, data visualization, translational AI, and high-performance computing. Project Waterworth, a 50,000 km undersea cable for high-speed connectivity required to propel AI innovation, was unveiled by Meta on 14 February 2025. It will link South Africa, Brazil, India, the United States, and other regions. India is among the nations with the highest usage of Meta AI on WhatsApp and Instagram.

=== Defence ===
A task force for the Strategic Implementation of AI for National Security and Defence was established in February 2018 by the Ministry of Defense's Department of Defence Production. The process of getting the military ready for AI use was started by the MoD in 2019. The Centre for Artificial Intelligence and Robotics was approved to develop AI solutions for signal intelligence to improve intelligence collection and analysis capabilities at a cost of ₹73.9 crore and Energy Harvesting Based Infrared Sensor Network for Automated Human Intrusion Detection (EYESIRa) at a cost of ₹1.8 crore. In 2021, the Indian Army, with assistance from the National Security Council, began operating the Quantum Lab and Artificial Intelligence Center at the Military College of Telecommunication Engineering. With an emphasis on robotics and artificial intelligence, Defence Research and Development Organisation and Indian Institute of Science established the Joint Advanced Technology Programme-Center of Excellence. In 2022, the Indian Navy created an AI Core group and set up a Center of Excellence for AI and Big Data analysis at INS Valsura. Indian Army incubated Artificial Intelligence Offensive Drone Operations Project in partnership with an Indian startup. Tonbo Imaging integrated real-time target identification and Edge AI image processing into MPATGM. During Exercise Dakshin Shakti 2021, the Indian Army integrated AI into its intelligence, surveillance, and reconnaissance architecture to provide a cohesive operational intelligence picture of the battlefield.

In 2022, the Indian government established the Defence Artificial Intelligence Council and the Defence AI Project Agency, and it also published a list of 75 defense-related AI priority projects. MoD earmarked ₹1,000 crore annually till 2026 for capacity building, infrastructure setup, data preparation, and Al project implementation. The Indian Army, the Indian Navy and the Indian Air Force set aside ₹100 crore annually for the development of AI-specific applications. The military is already deploying some AI-enabled projects and equipment. At Air Force Station Rajokri, the IAF Centre of Excellence for Artificial Intelligence was established in 2022 as part of the Unit for Digitization, Automation, Artificial Intelligence, and Application Networking (UDAAN). Swarm drone systems were introduced by the Mechanised Infantry Regiment for offensive operations close to LAC.

Grene Robotics revealed Indrajaal Autonomous Drone Defense Dome. For offensive operations, the military began acquiring AI-enabled UAVs and swarm drones. Bharat Electronics developed AI-enabled audio transcription and analysis software for battlefield communication. Using AI during transport operations, the Indian Army's Research & Development branch patented driver tiredness monitoring system. As part of initial investment, the Indian Armed Forces is investing about $50 million (€47.2 million) yearly on AI, according to Delhi Policy Group think tank. For high altitude logistics at forward outposts, military robots are deployed. Army is developing autonomous combat vehicles, robotic surveillance platforms, and Manned-Unmanned Teaming (MUM-T) solutions as part of the Defence AI roadmap. MCTE is working with the Ministry of Electronics and Information Technology and, Society for Applied Microwave Electronics Engineering & Research, on AI and military-grade chipset. Phase III of AI-enabled space-based surveillance has been authorized.

DRDO Chairman and Secretary of the Department of Defense Research & Development Samir V. Kamat said the agency started concentrating on the potential use of AI in the development of military systems and subsystems. The Indian government intends to leverage the private sector's sizable AI workforce and dual-use technologies for defense by 2026. In order to conduct research on autonomous platforms, improved surveillance, predictive maintenance, and intelligent decision support system, the Indian Army AI Incubation Center was established. Indian Navy launched INS Surat with AI capabilities.

In order to identify and locate any hostile objects in the sky during Operation Sindoor, the Indian military employed AI cloud-based integrated air command and control systems. The Indian Army tested an AI-powered Negev NG-7 on 9 June 2025, developed by BSS Material. MoD has approved 129 AI projects until 2026, 77 of which have been finished. To identify and categorize hostile aircraft activities, BEL has created an AI system accessible through the Integrated Air Command and Control System. To analyze and automate enemy intercepts in the Western Theater, the Indian Army has developed an Intercept Management System that generates intelligence picture by interpreting data using AI and visualization. It can use AI to perform automated analysis and interpretation, as well as classify and visualize intercepts. To identify airborne targets and eliminate the threat far from susceptible locations, CAIR has created an AI-based Air Defense Control and Reporting System.

To guarantee smooth data exchange between field units and command centers, XXXIII Corps tested AI-enabled sensors with secure communication networks during Exercise Divya Drishti in July 2025. A sensor-to-shooter link was successfully established by the Indian Army, allowing for a quicker and more efficient reaction time. On 10 September 2025, the Indian Army received a patent for its AI-powered Automatic Target Classifying System. Using real-time data, such as images or radar signals, it can automatically recognize and categorize targets on radar by comparing them to a database of recorded data. It is useful for guiding missiles.

=== Internal security ===
To dismantle organized crime and terrorism networks, Ministry of Home Affairs established Organised Crime Network Database on 26 December 2025. The database was launched by Union Home Minister Amit Shah at Anti-Terror Conference in Delhi. Investigative agencies can utilize the OCND, an AI-powered advanced analytics tool to rapidly gather comprehensive information about terrorist networks and crime syndicates. Investigating agencies can instantly access first information reports, chargesheets, dossiers, and other vital information about crimes from all Indian states. To create the OCND, the National Investigation Agency collaborated closely with state police agencies and NATGRID. OCND functions like ChatGPT and offers voice matching and fingerprint data in addition to profile data.

=== Space ===
MOI-TD, India's first AI lab in space, is being built by TakeMe2Space. AI's potential utility in space will be demonstrated with the MOI-TD mission. In order to foresee natural disasters and comprehend climate change, the MOI-TD will assist with environmental monitoring, weather pattern analysis, and Earth's surface change tracking. The lab will process the data in real time, allowing for analysis of the information at the time of collection. The MOI-TD mission showed that it was possible to run external code on the satellite, securely downlink encrypted data, and uplink huge AI models from a ground station through OrbitLab, a web-based console. It effectively validated key subsystems, including computer infrastructure (Zero Cube AI Accelerator, POEM Adapter Board), actuators (MagnetoTorquers, AirTorquers, Reaction Wheel), and sensors (Sun Sensor, Horizon Sensor, Solar Cell, IMUs). The foundation for space-based computing is laid by MOI-TD. The creation of space-based data centers will be facilitated by the upcoming MOI-1 AI Lab mission. Support for the project came from the Indian National Space Promotion and Authorization Center. One study by the University of Southampton on TakeMe2Space's AI lab used a low-power AI system to lessen motion blur in satellite imagery.

=== Healthcare ===
During the COVID-19 pandemic, Qure.ai's AI chest X-ray reporting tool, qXR, was used to identify patients for high, medium, or low risk so that RT-PCR testing could be performed. It can identify pulmonary consolidation, ground-glass opacity, and other signs of COVID-19. The tool provides measurements like the proportion of lung size and volume impacted by the anomalies. The Computational and Data Sciences Collaborative Laboratory of Artificial Intelligence in Medical and Healthcare Imaging was established by Wipro GE HealthCare at IISc in September 2020. Its goal is to develop advanced diagnostic and medical image-reconstruction techniques and protocols for quicker and better imaging by utilizing deep learning, AI, and future-ready digital interfaces.

With an emphasis on neurological disease diagnosis and population-level clinical impact analysis, Siemens Healthineers established the Computational Data Sciences Collaborative Laboratory for AI in Precision Medicine at IISc in 2024 to create open-source AI tools to automate the segmentation of pathological findings in neuroimaging data.

As part of the Interdisciplinary Group for Advanced Research on Birth Outcomes – DBT India Initiative (GARBH-Ini) program, IIT Madras and Translational Health Science and Technology Institute in 2024 created India's first AI model, Garbhini-GA2, which will accurately estimate the age of the fetus in pregnant women in the second and third trimesters. In contrast to the current methods of determining a fetus's age in India, which use the Hadlock model developed using pregnancy data from Western countries or the more recent INTERGROWTH-21st model, the Garbhini-GA2, which is specific to the Indian population, uses genetic algorithm-based methods for estimating gestational age. This model reduces the error by nearly three times. The study was carried out in collaboration with Pondicherry Institute of Medical Sciences, Christian Medical College Vellore, Safdarjung Hospital, and Gurugram Civil Hospital. Following the completion of pan-India validation, Garbhini-GA2 will be implemented in clinics throughout the country. The Ministry of Science and Technology's Department of Biotechnology provided financing for the research, with additional support from the Robert Bosch Centre for Data Science and Artificial Intelligence (IIT Madras) and the Centre for Integrative Biology and Systems Medicine (IIT Madras).

In order to support healthy aging, constructive lifestyle modifications, and psycho-social wellbeing, Wipro and the Centre for Brain Research at IISc partnered in May 2024 to create an AI-based personal care engine that will consider a person's past medical history, desired health state, and behavioral responses to offer personalized help with chronic disease prevention and treatment. Researchers from St. John's Hospital and IIIT-B are focusing on using computer vision for early detection of autism.

=== Mobility ===
In an effort to improve road safety and decrease fatalities by half, Minister of Road Transport and Highways Nitin Gadkari inaugurated Intelligent Solutions for Road Safety through Technology and Engineering (iRASTE) under Mission Zero on 11 September 2021. The pilot project will run for two years in Nagpur. Intel, International Institute of Information Technology, Hyderabad, Central Road Research Institute, Mahindra & Mahindra, and Nagpur Municipal Corporation are part of the pilot project. It is focusing on vehicle safety, mobility analysis, and infrastructure safety.

To improve vehicle safety, NMC will outfit its fleet of vehicles with advanced driver-assistance systems and collision avoidance systems. They will also be equipped with sensors which will continuously monitor the road network's dynamic risks for mobility analysis, mapping the city into three zones: white (normal), grey (accident could happen), and black (accident has already happened). The data will be gathered by Intel AI Center at IIIT-H for monitoring and fixing the grey and black zones.

MINRO at IIIT-B is working on traffic analysis of Indian road conditions, analyzing traffic data, and using data for multimodal transport to make recommendations about the locations of rail transit and bus stations.

=== Government ===
In 2021, the Ministry of Corporate Affairs introduced the first phase of MCA21 V3.0. It will allow for the electronic filing of documents under the corporate law and public access to corporate information. AI will be utilized by the platform to gather, organize, and classify stakeholder comments and inputs and produce analytical reports that will facilitate speedy policy choices.

With assistance from Google, the Ministry of Agriculture and Farmers' Welfare and the Wadhwani Institute for Artificial Intelligence created Krishi 24/7, the first AI-powered automated agricultural news monitoring and analysis tool. Through better decision-making, Krishi 24/7 will support the identification of valuable news, provide timely notifications, and respond quickly to safeguard farmers' interests and advance sustainable agricultural growth. The application converts news articles into English after scanning them in several languages. It ensures that the ministry is informed in a timely manner about pertinent occurrences that are published online by extracting key information from news items, including the headline, crop name, event type, date, location, severity, summary, and source link. The National Center for Disease Control has effectively implemented a comparable automated surveillance and analysis tool for disease outbreaks.

As part of the Safe City initiative, 1,000 AI cameras with facial recognition were placed at a cost of ₹96 crore in Lucknow's commercial districts, colleges, hostels, large crossings, and public gathering spots. By integrating with the National Automated Fingerprint Identification System, the cameras will detect suspicious movement of individuals by comparing their faces to a police database, notify control rooms of any criminal activities, and send out alerts against illegal dumping. For a more responsive and linked security network, AI will be included into crisis hotlines and helplines.

In collaboration with the Indian government, IIIT-B created Datalake, a tool that analyzes government data on a range of projects to determine whether the objectives of the policy have been fulfilled and whether there is room for improvement. It can forecast how to modify the beneficiary structure to comply with the policy and benefit the citizens.

The Government of Uttar Pradesh used facial recognition and AI-powered crowd density monitoring, RFID wristbands as part of the security setup for the 2025 Prayag Maha Kumbh Mela. Plans to establish India's first AI lab aimed at strengthening cyber surveillance operations against deepfake threats and the country’s first tea auction driven by blockchain and AI, were announced by the Assam government in the state budget for 2025–2026. It will focus on real-time online threat detection, digital forensics, and cybersecurity. The lab will track cyberthreats, and assess misleading media.

The AI Competency Framework was unveiled on 6 March 2025 by Ashwini Vaishnaw, the Minister for Electronics and information Technology, in recognition of the crucial role AI plays in governance. Its goal is to provide public sector professionals with the necessary skills for upskilling programs and AI competency mapping. This framework guarantees informed AI policy-making and implementation by conforming to international best practices. To improve government officials' iGOT Karmayogi platform learning experience, a tailored content suggestion system driven by AI was also unveiled.

=== Society ===
Wadhwani AI, a $30 million nonprofit research institute, was established in 2018 by Romesh Wadhwani and Sunil Wadhwani with the goal of enhancing the lives of the world's poorest 2 billion people. New York University, the University of Southern California, India Institutes of Technology, and University of Mumbai will collaborate with the institute. The objective is to have solutions that show how AI can help the underprivileged, and then to build on those initial instances. Wadhwani AI will support universities from developing nations in expanding their AI capabilities.

As part of Microsoft's Global Skills for Social Impact charter, the ADVANTA(I)GE India program's first phase trained 2.4 million people in AI skills between 2024 and 2025; 74% of these persons came from tier 2 and tier 3 cities, and 65% of them were women. Another 10 million people will be trained by 2030 as part of the second phase.

The Ministry of Electronics and Information Technology launched IndiaAI Application Development Initiative on 6 March 2025. The aim is to create, scale, and encourage the usage of AI to improve the socioeconomic landscape of the country. In order to solve issues in the fields of healthcare, agriculture, governance, climate change, disaster management, and learning disabilities, IndiaAI has initiated the IndiaAI Innovation Challenge. Enhancing access to public services, improving healthcare, increasing agricultural productivity, helping people with learning disabilities, and lessening the effects of climate change are the goals. With the goal of lowering entry barriers in the field of AI, the IndiaAI FutureSkills Initiative will expand the number of AI courses offered in undergraduate, graduate, and doctoral level. To deliver foundational level training, IndiaAI Data Labs are being set up in tier 2 and tier 3 locations throughout the country. IndiaAI has created the two courses for the positions of Data Curator and Data Annotator, with an emphasis on industries like manufacturing, healthcare, education, and agriculture. These will be taught in IndiaAI Data Labs located throughout 28 centers of the National Institute of Electronics & Information Technology, and industrial training institutes.

An MoU was signed on 5 June 2025, between OpenAI and the IndiaAI Mission to establish OpenAI Academy, which would provide AI education training materials in Hindi, English, and four regional languages for students, developers, educators, civil servants, nonprofit leaders, and small business owners. It will integrate with IndiaAI FutureSkills Initiative and iGOT Karmayogi platform. One million teachers will receive training on how to use GenAI in the classroom. Additionally, 50 startups or fellows recognized by the IndiaAI Mission will get API credits from OpenAI worth up to $100,000. OpenAI has extended its AI for Impact Accelerator program by giving 11 NGOs a total of $150,000 in technical funding to develop AI solutions for underserved industries like healthcare, education, and agriculture.

=== Finance and insurance ===
In India's banking, financial services and insurance (BFSI) industries, AI is already in use as of 2024 and the use of AI by BFSI companies is growing. Banks in India are using it for predictive analytics, fraud detection, and personalisation services. In capital markets, AI is being used for high-frequency trading and quantitative analysis. AI is being used by insurance companies for underwriting, fraud detection and damage assessment. However, with the growth of AI usage in the BFSI sector, the Indian government has also stated that AI, including deepfakes and prompt hacking of large language models, is being used for cyberattacks on BFSI companies.

== Safety and regulation ==
In order to determine whether to create an AI Safety Institute (AISI) that can establish standards, frameworks, and guidelines for AI development without serving as a regulatory body or stifling innovation, MeitY conducted consultation process with Meta Platforms, Google, Microsoft, IBM, OpenAI, NASSCOM, Broadband India Forum, Software Alliance, Indian Institutes of Technology, The Quantum Hub, Digital Empowerment Foundation, and Access Now on 7 October 2024. It was decided that instead of focusing on regulation, the AISI would focus on damage detection, risk identification, and standards setting for which interoperable systems are necessary to prevent the development of silos which may eventually influence future policies. The Safe and Trusted Pillar of the IndiaAI Mission has been allocated ₹20 crore, which the AISI may use for the inaugural budget. More money from the IndiaAI Mission's other verticals may be used in the future.

In order to develop an AI policy report tailored to India and assess the country's AI ecosystem's strengths and future prospects, UNESCO and MeitY began consulting on AI Readiness Assessment Methodology under Safety and Ethics in Artificial Intelligence from 2024. It is to encourage the ethical and responsible use of AI in industries. The study will help find areas where government can become involved, especially in attempts to strengthen institutional and regulatory capabilities.

Minister for Electronics & Information Technology Ashwini Vaishnaw announced the creation of an IndiaAI Safety Institute on 30 January 2025, to ensure the ethical and safe application of AI models. The institute will promote domestic research and development that is grounded in India's social, economic, cultural, and linguistic diversity and is based on Indian datasets. With the help of academic and research institutions, as well as private sector partners, the institute will follow the hub-and-spoke approach to carry out projects within Safe and Trusted Pillar of the IndiaAI Mission. Among the major safety-related initiatives are eight ongoing projects to implement a techno-legal strategy to protect data privacy while conducting an ethical audit of algorithmic effectiveness.

First round of projects are as follows:

Theme	Institute	Project
Machine unlearning	IIT Jodhpur	Develop method for targeted unlearning in open-source generative foundation models while minimizing negative impact on overall model performance.
Synthetic data generation	IIT Roorkee	Design and develop method for generating synthetic data for mitigating bias in datasets.; Framework for mitigating bias in machine learning pipeline for responsible AI.; Develop algorithm for handling the bias at the model training and in-processing stage of machine learning model development.
AI bias mitigation strategy	National Institute of Technology, Raipur	Development of algorithms for bias mitigation in health care system applications, image analysis, and diagnostic decisions.
Explainable AI framework	Defence Institute of Advanced Technology	Enabling explainable and privacy preserving AI.; Creating AI models to provide accurate and interpretable results for human activity analysis for effective security in crowded environment.
Explainable AI framework	Mindgraph Technologies	Enabling explainable and privacy preserving AI.; Creating AI models to provide accurate and interpretable results for human activity analysis for effective security in crowded environment.
Privacy enhancing strategies	IIT Delhi	Privacy preserving machine learning models.; Develop distributed learning algorithms that can perform in an adversarial environment susceptible to attacks.
Privacy enhancing strategies	IIT Dharwad	Privacy preserving machine learning models.; Develop distributed learning algorithms that can perform in an adversarial environment susceptible to attacks.
Privacy enhancing strategies	Indraprastha Institute of Information Technology, Delhi	Privacy preserving machine learning models.; Develop distributed learning algorithms that can perform in an adversarial environment susceptible to attacks.
Privacy enhancing strategies	Telecommunication Engineering Centre	Privacy preserving machine learning models.; Develop distributed learning algorithms that can perform in an adversarial environment susceptible to attacks.
AI ethical certification framework	IIIT-Delhi	Nishpaksh: tools for assessing fairness of AI model.; Develop three step certification process involving bias risk assessment, processing for metrics, and bias testing to ensure fairness for AI systems in the Indian context.
AI ethical certification framework	TEC	Nishpaksh: tools for assessing fairness of AI model.; Develop three step certification process involving bias risk assessment, processing for metrics, and bias testing to ensure fairness for AI systems in the Indian context.
AI algorithm auditing framework	Civic Data Lab	ParakhAI: open-source framework and toolkit for participatory algorithmic auditing. It will involve citizens in the responsible design, development, and deployment of algorithmic decision making systems.
AI governance testing framework	Amrita Vishwa Vidyapeetham	Track large language model, transparency, risk-assessment, context and knowledge for LLMs. Identify and address specific gaps in the existing governance testing frameworks related to LLM's downstream use-case and deployment.
AI governance testing framework	TEC	Track large language model, transparency, risk-assessment, context and knowledge for LLMs. Identify and address specific gaps in the existing governance testing frameworks related to LLM's downstream use-case and deployment.

Themes for second round of projects include watermarking and labelling, ethical AI frameworks, AI risk-assessment and management, stress testing tools, and deepfake detection tools.

Infosys released an open-source "Responsible AI" toolbox on 26 February 2025. The program, is a component of the Infosys Topaz Responsible AI Suite. It assists in identifying and stopping security risks, privacy violations, biased outputs, damaging content, copyright infringement, false information, deepfakes, and the use of malevolent AI. The toolkit can improve the transparency of outcomes produced by AI. It works with both on-premises and cloud systems. Citing concerns about the confidentiality of government data and documents, the Ministry of Finance issued an internal department caution advising staff not to use AI tools like ChatGPT and DeepSeek for work-related purposes.

In order to comply with the Digital Personal Data Protection Act, 2023 and other sovereignty requirements, OpenAI allowed the local storage of data for ChatGPT Enterprise, ChatGPT Edu, and OpenAI API platform customers from 8 May 2025. Talks to establish data center operations in India have already been started by OpenAI.

Google launched its Safety Charter for India's AI-led transformation on 18 June 2025. Keeping end users safe, cybersecurity for government and enterprise infrastructure, and responsibly developing AI are the three core pillars that it outlines for addressing the difficulties of the online world in partnership with the larger ecosystem. In order to operationalize Google's Safety Charter, Google Safety Engineering Center in Hyderabad was established.

== See also ==
- HCLTech
- Infosys
- Tata Elxsi
- Sarvam AI

== Related articles ==
- Artificial intelligence industry in Canada
- Artificial intelligence industry in China
- Artificial intelligence industry in Italy
- Artificial intelligence industry in the United Kingdom
