= S. Krishnan =

Indian bureaucrat

S. Krishnan IAS
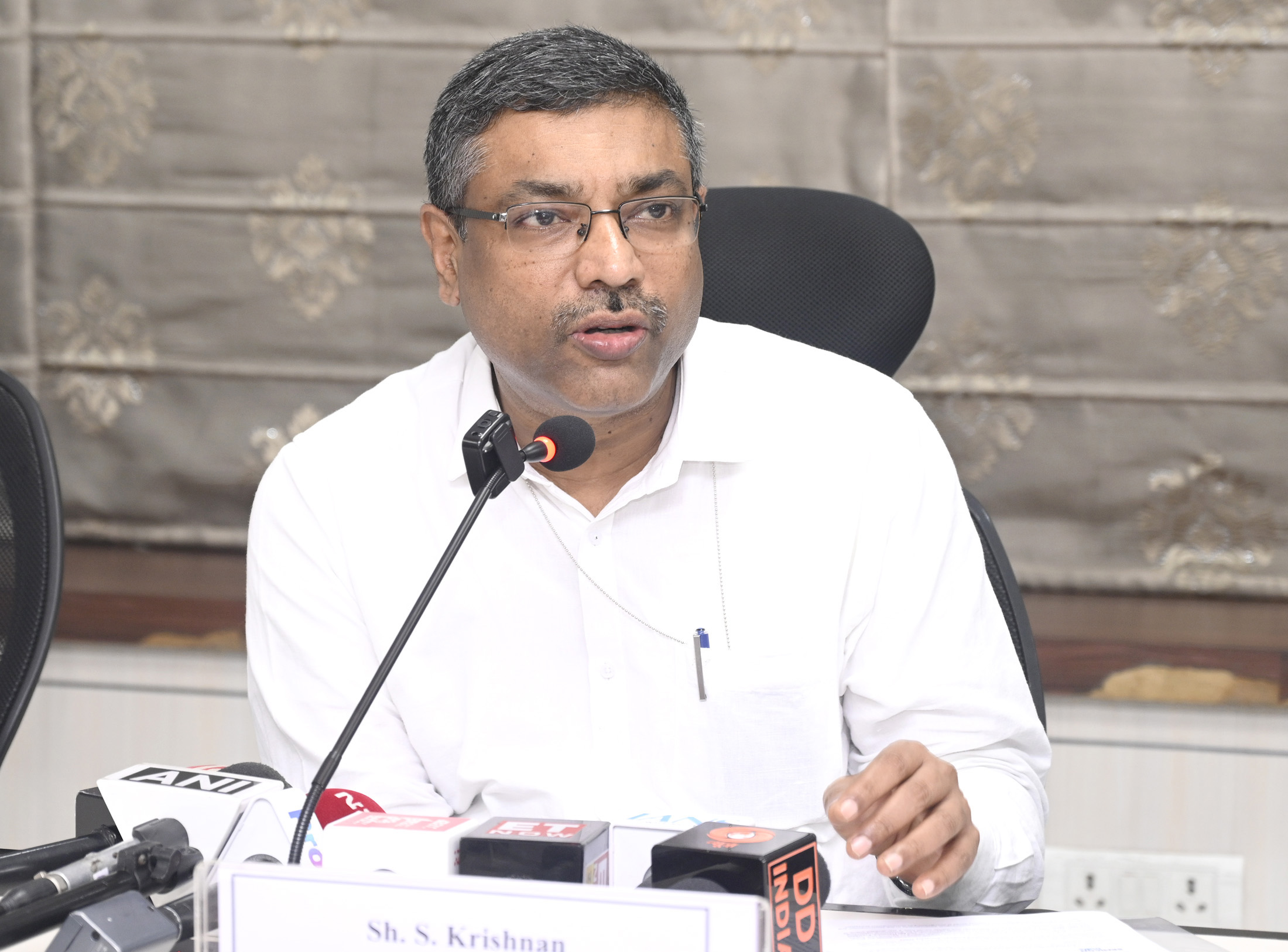

Secretary in Ministry of Electronics and Information Technology, Government of India
- Incumbent
- Assumed office 11 September 2023
- Minister: Ashwini Vaishnaw
- Preceded by: Alkesh Kumar Sharma

Additional Chief Secretary of Department of Industries, Tamil Nadu
- In office 31 March 2020 – 31 August 2023
- Appointed by: Government of Tamil Nadu

Personal details
- Born: 29 June 1967 (age 59) India
- Education: (B.A) St. Stephen's College, Delhi; Delhi University
- Occupation: IAS officer
- Profession: Civil servant

S. Krishnan is an Indian Administrative Service officer of Tamil Nadu cadre who is serving as the Secretary to the Government of India since August 2023. He has previously worked as Additional Chief Secretary, Department of Industries in Tamil Nadu Government from March, 2020 to August, 2023.

Prior to his present assignment, Krishnan held some key positions in the Government of Tamil Nadu, such as, Additional Chief Secretary, Department of Industries (Tamil Nadu) and Principal Secretary in Department of Housing and Urban Development (Tamil Nadu). He was also the inaugural CEO of Tamil Nadu Infrastructure Development Board and chairman of the Fifth Tamil Nadu State Finance Commission.

== Activities undertaken as secretary ==
He oversees critical initiatives such as:

- The India Semiconductor Mission and enactment of the Digital Personal Data Protection (DPDP) Act and the Digital India Act.
- Scaling up indigenous electronics production and the India AI Mission to create a scalable AI-compute ecosystem.
- Increasing value addition in electronics within India. (mobile phones domestic value addition, targeting growth from ~20% to 35–40%)
- Launch of silicon photonics R&D and products at IIT Madras, including the Centre of Excellence for Silicon Photonics (CoE‑CPPICS), Fiber-Array Unit attachment tools, and a quantum random number generator (QRNG) module deployed at SETS Chennai.
- Commissioning of the NIELIT Centre of Excellence in Chip Design at Noida to conduct VLSI & chip-design research and training.
- Encouraging accessible digital opportunity through multilingual technologies such as Bhashini and internationalized domain names (IDNs).
- Emphasizing collaboration among government, industry, and academia to accelerate India’s tech progress.
