= Kruti =

AI agent developed by Ola Krutrim

- Developer: Ola Krutrim
- Release: June 12, 2025; 15 months ago
- Written in: Python
- Predecessor: khushi
- Type: AI chatbot, AI agent
- License: Proprietary
- Website: www.kruti.ai

Kruti is a multilingual AI agent and chatbot developed by the Indian company Ola Krutrim. It is designed to perform real-world tasks for users, such as booking taxis and ordering food, by integrating directly with various online services. It is notable for its ability to understand and respond in multiple Indian languages.

Developed by a team founded by Bhavish Aggarwal, Kruti functions as an "agentic" AI, meaning it can reason, plan, and execute multi-step tasks to fulfill a user's request. The backend technology combines several open-source large language models with Ola's proprietary Krutrim V2 model. The system was developed to work primarily on smartphones, addressing the Indian market's specific needs, including language diversity and potential bandwidth constraints.

Kruti was officially released in June 2025, replacing an earlier chatbot from the company that was also named Krutrim. Initially supporting 13 languages, the company plans to expand its capabilities to 22 Indian languages.

== Background ==
Kruti is an improved version of Ola's Krutrim chatbot, which was first launched in 2023 and was intended to be replaced by Kruti. It was officially released on 12 June 2025 as an upgrade to passive chatbots, with support for text and voice in 13 Indian languages. As an agentic AI, it can execute tasks with customization and reasoning, providing adaptive answers based on user preferences and past interactions.

Kruti is optimized for smartphone usage and designed to accommodate bandwidth constraints and usage patterns in India. To ensure scalability and cost-effective performance, it combines various open-source large language models with Ola's own Krutrim V2, which has 12 billion parameters. Its speech recognition is built to identify regional Indian languages, dialects, and accents. Due to its integration with numerous apps and services, Kruti is context-aware and can proactively complete tasks.

Initially connected only with Ola ecosystem services, Krutrim intends to expand and incorporate various Indian services into Kruti, with the goal of adding services from Blinkit, Swiggy, and Uber with respective voice command support. On 20 June 2025, Krutrim acquired the AI platform BharatSah‘AI’yak to increase its involvement in government, education, and agriculture projects. This acquisition will allow Kruti to assist in broadening the scope of BharatSah'AI'yak's work on India-centric, vernacular retrieval-augmented generation AI bots.

== Development ==
Kruti is designed to perform tasks with minimal user input, accepting documents, images, and text, without requiring users to switch between applications. Its agentic framework breaks queries into sub-tasks executed by multiple agents working sequentially or concurrently, with reported accuracy exceeding 90%.

Kruti connects to company databases and APIs via the Model Context Protocol and presents responses as summaries, tables, or narratives adapted to user behaviour. The system supports payments via credit/debit cards and UPI. The underlying stack, which includes foundation models and AI training and inference systems, is intended to support adaptation across sectors such as healthcare, education, and finance. Ola Cabs and the Open Network for Digital Commerce have begun integrating Kruti into their platforms pending broader reliability testing.

== See also ==
- Sarvam AI
- Haptik
- OpenAI Operator
- ChatGPT Deep Research
- Manus
- Devin AI
- AutoGPT
