= MathCo =

Data-engineering firm

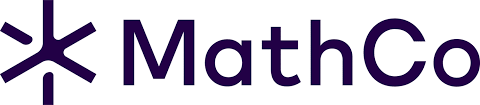
- Type: Private
- Industry: AI and Analytics
- Founded: 2016
- Headquarters: Chicago, Illinois, US, and Bangalore, Karnataka, India
- Area served: Worldwide
- Key people: Sayandeb Banerjee (Cofounder & CEO) Aditya Kumbakonam (Cofounder & COO) Anuj Krishna (Cofounder & President - Technology and Growth)
- Number of employees: 1200
- Website: mathco.com

MathCo (formally TheMathCompany) is an AI, data analytics and engineering firm with its headquarters in both Chicago and Bangalore.

== History ==
The MathCompany was founded by Sayandeb Banerjee, Aditya Kumbakonam, and Anuj Krishna. The company has offices in Chicago, Austin, Bangalore, and also operates in Canada, the Netherlands, and the United Kingdom, Singapore, Hong Kong, and the Middle East. Sayandeb Banerjee serves as the CEO of the company.

In 2019, the company received initial backing from Arihant Patni, managing director of Patni Financial Advisors. In 2021, it expanded its operations in Europe. In February 2022, TheMathCompany initiated an Employee Stock Ownership Plan (ESOP) buy-back program, resulting in the repurchase of ESOPs valued at Rs. 93.2 crores. Approximately 20 percent of the company's existing employees participated in the program. The company secured an additional $50 million in funding from Brighton Park Capital.

In 2022, TheMathCompany teamed up with Great Learning to develop a Data Engineering module for their data science and engineering postgraduate program. The company was included in the Deloitte Technology Fast 50 India program and was listed in the 2022 Inc. 5000. In 2023, the company rebranded itself as MathCo and announced the integration of GenAI features into its proprietary platform, Co.dx, which is now known as NucliOS. NucliOS is a proprietary analytics platform used for developing low-code and customized applications.

In February 2023, MathCo partnered with Women in Data, a non-profit organization that supports women in the data and analytics field. They also signed an MOU with Amrita Vishwa Vidyapeetham for the MathCo Campus Programme.

== Awards ==
In 2019, MathCo's founders received the 'Entrepreneur of the Year' award. In 2022, two of its co-founders were in Fortune India's "40 under 40" list, and the company ranked 2nd in the Deloitte Technology Fast 50 India program. It was also listed in the 2022 Inc. 5000. In 2023, MathCo was named 'Startup of the Year' by Entrepreneur India, received an award from FastCompany, and was featured in INDIAai.
