= Limeroad =

Indian online marketplace

- Company type: Privately held company
- Website type: E-commerce
- Available in: Hindi, English
- Area served: India
- Founders: Suchi Mukherjee, Ankush Mehra
- CEO: Suchi Mukherjee
- Parent: V-Mart Retail
- Website: www.limeroad.com
- Commercial: no
- Registration: Required
- Launched: 2012; 14 years ago
- Current status: Active

Limeroad, stylized as LimeRoad is an Indian online marketplace, owned by V-Mart Retail. The company is based in Gurugram, Haryana.

It is India's first women's social shopping website. It deals in clothing and accessories for women, men and kids. The portal allows its users to create their own look on a virtual scrapbook by using its products and also allows users to earn from the scrapbook they create.

== Background ==
Limeroad was founded in 2012 by Suchi Mukherjee, Manish Saksena and Ankush Mehra as a fashion marketplace for women. The company's name is inspired from Grand Trunk Road.

The company raised US$5 million Series A round of funding from Matrix Partners and Lightspeed Venture Partners in 2012 followed by Series B round US$15 million in 2014 and Series C round US$30 million from Tiger Global, Lightspeed Venture Partners and Matrix Partners in 2015.

In 2016, Limeroad came into partnership with the Madhya Pradesh Government's M.P. Laghu Udyog Nigam (MPLUN) to promote handloom and handicraft products online in India.

Limeroad competes with e-commerce companies such as Amazon, Flipkart and Snapdeal, Myntra, Jabong, Roposo, Wooplr and Voonik.

== Awards ==
| Year | Award(s) | Awarding organisation | Result | Ref. |
|---|---|---|---|---|
| 2015 | Coolest Start-up of the year | Business Today (India) | Won | |
| 2015 | Infocom Woman of the Year - Digital Business | INFOCOM | Won | |
| 2016 | Unicorn Start-up Award | NDTV | Won | |
| 2017 | ET Startup Award | The Economic Times | Nominated | |

== See also ==
- Social shopping
- E-commerce in India
- Online shopping
