= Zysman =

Zysman is a surname. Notable people with the surname include:

- Jack Hardy (born Dale Zysman, 1901–1993), American labor leader and teacher
- John Zysman (born 1946), American political scientist
- Shalom Zysman (1914–1967), Israeli politician

== See also ==
- Zisman
