= Niki.ai =

Artificial intelligence company

niki.ai
- Formerly: zabbed
- Founded: 1 March 2015; 11 years ago Udaipur, India
- Founder: Sachin Jaiswal; Shishir Modi; Keshav Prawasi; Nitin Babel
- Headquarters: Bangalore, India; 12°56′35″N 77°37′19″E
- Number of locations: 1 (2018)
- Area served: India
- Number of employees: 50 (2018)
- Website: niki.ai

Niki was an artificial intelligence company headquartered in Bangalore, Karnataka. It was founded in May 2015 by IIT Kharagpur graduates Sachin Jaiswal, Keshav Prawasi, Shishir Modi, and Nitin Babel.

== History ==
The Niki android app was launched for a limited beta in June 2015, then released for public during YourStory's TechSparks 2015, and is a Tech30 company. The company raised an undisclosed amount in seed funding from Unilazer Ventures, a Mumbai-based VC firm founded by Ronnie Screwvala, in October 2015. This was followed by another seed funding round by Ratan Tata in May 2016. The company then raised US$2 million in Series A round of funding from SAP.iO, existing investors and some US and German-based investors, among others. Niki.ai shut down in October 2021 as per media reports. Its website has ceased operation.

== Product ==
The product is an artificial intelligence-powered chatbot which worked as an intelligent personal assistant, named Niki. Leveraging natural language processing and machine learning, Niki presented a chat-based natural language user interface to the users where they could interact with Niki in their natural language. Niki aimed to understand how users chat in India, decipher the words, in the context of product/services that they would like to purchase, and comes up with recommendations.

Initially, it was only available on the Android platform as a mobile app. The company expanded its operations to the Facebook Messenger and Apple iOS platforms.

The company provided 20+ services to over 2 million consumers, covering a wide spectrum ranging from utility services like mobile recharge, bill payments, travel services like cabs, buses, hotels and entertainment services like movies and events. Services such as flights and healthcare were also planned.

== Partnerships ==
In September 2017, Infosys Finacle joined with Niki.ai to provide chat-based service to banking customers.

In August 2017, Niki partnered with LazyPay to enable a 'buy now, pay later' feature for its users.

== See also ==
- Artificial Intelligence
- AI Companies of India
