= Capillary Technologies =

Software company

- Type: Public
- Traded as: NSE: CAPILLARY; BSE: 544614
- Industry: Artificial intelligence Software as a service
- Founded: August 2008 in Bengaluru, India
- Headquarters: Singapore
- Number of locations: 14 offices
- Area served: Worldwide
- Key people: Aneesh Reddy (CEO); Anant Choubey (COO); Rohan Mahadar (CPO); Piyush Kumar (CTO)
- Products: Intelligent Loyalty Platform
- Brands: Capillary; Brierley
- Revenue: ▲₹598 crore (US$62 million) (FY25)
- Net income: ▲₹14 crore (US$1.5 million) (FY25)
- Number of employees: 400 (2023)
- Subsidiaries: Brierley+Partners
- Website: capillarytech.com

Capillary Technologies is a multinational software as a service company. Its primary product is the cloud-based customer loyalty/customer engagement and e-commerce platform, Intelligent Loyalty. Capillary also offers loyalty and other marketing consulting services.

Capillary Technologies was founded in Bengaluru in 2008, and is headquartered in Singapore.

== History ==
Capillary Technologies was founded in August 2008 by Aneesh Reddy, Krishna Mehra, and Ajay Modani and initially headquartered in Bengaluru, India. In 2009, Capillary received $100,000 from the QPrize Business Plan Competition by Qualcomm.

In September 2012, Capillary raised $15.5 million from Sequoia Capital, Norwest Venture Partners & Qualcomm. In 2013, Capillary Technologies was used as a case study for "reverse innovation" published in Harvard Business Review. In February 2014, Capillary received $4 million from American Express.

Capillary acquired the e-commerce software platform MartJack in September 2015, supported by a $45 million funding led by Warburg Pincus.

The company began expanding operations into China in July 2016. In October 2016, Capillary acquired SellerWorx, an e-commerce services and technology company.

In December 2016, Rajan Anandan, who at the time was Google's Vice President for Southeast Asia and India, joined Capillary's board of directors.

In February 2018, Capillary announced it raised $20 million in several tranches in 2017 and 2018 from existing investors Warburg Pincus and Sequoia Capital. In September 2019, Capillary partnered with Veda Holding, a Saudi investment holding company, to operate a Saudi-specific entity called Capillary Arabia.

In 2021, Capillary acquired Persuade, a U.S. loyalty platform provider.

Co-founder Aneesh Reddy operated as chief executive officer (CEO) of Capillary Technologies until 2022. In September 2022, Capillary Technologies announced that Sameer Garde would take over as the company's CEO and Reddy would transition to managing director.

In April 2023, Capillary acquired Brierley+Partners (known generally as Brierley), a loyalty agency and platform provider based in Frisco, Texas. In May 2023, Capillary raised $45 million from Avataar Ventures along with its limited partners (Pantheon, 57Stars, and Unigestion), Filter Capital, and Innoven Capital. In June 2023, Capillary announced it had acquired the Digital Connect technology assets of Tenerity, a US-based engagement and rewards platform provider.

In February 2024, Capillary raised $95 million in secondary deals. Garde resigned as CEO in March 2024 "due to personal reasons," and Reddy returned to the company's role as CEO.

== Platform ==
Capillary Technologies' primary product is its cloud-based SaaS platform Intelligent Loyalty, which includes modules with features for loyalty programs, customer engagement, and data analytics.
