= Classification of Indian cities =

City ranking system used in India

The classification of Indian cities is a ranking system used by the Government of India to allocate House Rent Allowance (HRA) to public servants employed in cities in India. HRA is also used by the Indian Revenue Service (IRS) to provide income tax exemptions. Cities are classified on the basis of their population, as recommended by the Sixth Central Pay Finance. Under the latest HRA city ranking scheme, most popular media and culture considers only Tier-X cities to be metropolitan in nature. These eight cities are considered India's "metros".

== Current classification ==
Under the recommendation of the Seventh Central Pay Commission, the CCA classification was abolished in 2008. The earlier HRA classification of cities was changed from A-1 to X; A, B-1, and B-2 to Y; and C and unclassified cities to Z. X, Y, and Z are more commonly known as Tier-1, Tier-2, and Tier-3 cities, respectively. There are eight X cities and ninety-seven Y cities.

On the basis of the 2011 census, two cities — Pune and Ahmedabad — were upgraded from Y to X and twenty one cities from Z to Y on 1 April 2014.

HRA classification	City
X	Ahmedabad, Bengaluru, Chennai, Delhi, Hyderabad, Kolkata, Mumbai and Pune
Y	Agra, Ajmer, Akola, Aligarh, Amravati, Amritsar, Anand, Asansol, Aurangabad, Bareilly, Bardhaman, Belagavi, Berhampur, Bhavnagar, Bhiwandi, Bhopal, Bhubaneswar, Bikaner, Bilaspur, Bokaro Steel City, Bellary, Bhilai, Chandigarh, Coimbatore, Cuttack, Dahod, Dehradun, Dhule, Dombivli, Dhanbad, Durgapur, Erode, Faridabad, Ghaziabad, Gorakhpur, Guntur, Gurgaon, Guwahati, Gwalior, Hamirpur, Hubballi–Dharwad, Indore, Jabalpur, Jaipur, Jalandhar, Jalgaon, Jammu, Jamshedpur, Jamnagar, Jhansi, Jodhpur, Kalaburagi, Kakinada, Kannur, Kanpur, Karimnagar, Karnal, Kochi, Kolhapur, Kollam, Kota, Kozhikode, Kumbakonam, Kurnool, Ludhiana, Lucknow, Madurai, Malappuram, Mathura, Mangaluru, Meerut, Mohali, Moradabad, Mysuru, Nagpur, Nanded, Nadiad, Nashik,Navi Mumbai, Nellore, Noida, Patna, Pimpri-Chinchwad, Puducherry, Purulia, Prayagraj, Raipur,Rajamahendravaram,Rajkot, Ranchi, Rourkela, Ratlam, Raichur, Saharanpur, Salem, Sangli, Shimla, Siliguri, Solapur, Srinagar, Surat, Thanjavur, Thiruvananthapuram, Thrissur, Tiruchirappalli, Tirunelveli, Tiruvannamalai, Ujjain, Vijayapura, Vadodara, Varanasi, Vasai-Virar, Vijayawada, Visakhapatnam, Vellore and Warangal
Z	All other cities and towns

== Historical classification ==
The cities were classified as follows before the Sixth Central Pay Commission's recommendations were followed in 2008. This classification was initially based on the recommendations of the Fifth Central Pay Commission of India in 1997. New Delhi, Mumbai, Kolkata, and Chennai were classified as A-1 cities. City statuses were later revised based on the results of the 2001 Census of India. Hyderabad was upgraded from A to A-1 status on 31 August 2007, and the same with Bangalore on 21 September 2007. The CCA classification was abolished in 2008.

Under the older HRA classification, most popular media and culture considered only A-1 cities to be metropolitan in nature, therefore India's "metros".

CCA classification	HRA classification	City
A-1	A-1	Delhi
A-1	A-1	Mumbai
A-1	A-1	Kolkata
A-1	A-1	Chennai
A-1	A-1	Bengaluru
A-1	A-1	Hyderabad
A	A	Ahmedabad
A	A	Indore
A	A	Vadodara
A	A	Navi Mumbai
A	A	Surat
A	A	Jaipur
A	A	Kozhikode
A	A	Kota
A	A	Lucknow
A	A	Kanpur
A	A	Pune
A	A	Thrissur
A	A	Coimbatore
A	A	Nagpur
A	A	Nadiad
A	A	Patna
A	A	Visakhapatnam
A	A	Bhopal
A	A	Nashik
A	A	Jabalpur
A	A	Gandhinagar
B-1	B-1	Madurai
B-1	B-1	Aligarh
B-1	B-1	Kochi
B-1	B-1	Vijayawada
B-1	B-1	Tiruchirappalli
B-1	B-1	Gwalior
B-1	B-1	Rajkot
B-1	B-1	Solapur
B-1	B-1	Anand
B-1	B-1	Ludhiana
B-1	B-1	Agra
B-1	B-1	Meerut
B-1	B-2	Thiruvananthapuram
B-1	B-2	Malappuram
B-1	B-2	Faridabad
B-1	B-2	Varanasi
B-1	B-2	Jamshedpur
B-1	B-2	Prayagraj
B-1	B-2	Amritsar
B-1	B-2	Dhanbad
B-2	B-2	Gorakhpur
B-2	B-2	Hubballi-Dharwad
B-2	B-2	Bhavnagar
B-2	B-2	Raipur
B-2	B-2	Bellary
B-2	B-2	Mysuru
B-2	B-2	Mangaluru
B-2	B-2	Guntur
B-2	B-2	Bhubaneswar
B-2	B-2	Amravati
B-2	B-2	Srinagar
B-2	B-2	Bhilai
B-2	B-2	Warangal
B-2	B-2	Tirunelveli
B-2	B-2	Nellore
B-2	B-2	Ranchi
B-2	B-2	Guwahati
B-2	B-2	Aurangabad
B-2	B-2	Chandigarh
B-2	B-2	Mohali
B-2	B-2	Patiala
B-2	B-2	Jodhpur
B-2	B-2	Puducherry
B-2	B-2	Salem
B-2	B-2	Vellore
B-2	C	Dehradun
B-2	C	Hajipur
B-2	C	Kollam
B-2	C	Sangli
B-2	C	Jamnagar
B-2	C	Jammu
B-2	C	Kurnool
B-2	C	Roorkee
B-2	C	Kannur
B-2	C	Thanjavur
B-2	C	Etawah

== Population-based classification ==
The Reserve Bank of India (RBI) classifies centres into six tiers based on population. The tables below show the classification.

Classification of centres (tier-wise)
Population classification	Population (2001 Census)
Tier-1	100,000 and above
Tier-2	50,000 to 99,999
Tier-3	20,000 to 49,999
Tier-4	10,000 to 19,999
Tier-5	5,000 to 9,999
Tier-6	less than 5,000

Population-group wise classification of centres
Population classification	Population (2001 Census)
Rural centre	up to 9,999
Semi-urban centre	10,000 to 99,999
Urban centre	100,000 to 999,999
Metropolitan centre	1,000,000 and above

== See also ==
- List of cities in India
- List of million-plus agglomerations in India
- Renaming of cities in India
