= Ziman =

Ziman is a surname. Notable people with the surname include:

- John Ziman (1925–2005), British-born New Zealand physicist and humanist

== See also ==
- Zisman
