= Telecommunication Engineering Centre =

The Telecommunication Engineering Centre is a nodal agency of the Department of Telecommunications, Ministry of Communications and Information Technology, Government of India which is responsible for drawing up of standards, generic requirements, interface requirements, service requirements and specifications for telecom products, services and networks.

The Telecommunication Engineering Centre (TEC) has headquarters in New Delhi. It has three additional regional centres in Kolkata, Mumbai and Bangalore.

== Organisation ==
The TEC consists of several specialised divisions covering various telecom technology areas including External Plant, Information Technology, Networks, Optical Transmission, Line Transmission, Radio Transmission, Satellite Transmission, Value Aided Services, Switching, and Mobile Communications

These divisions are responsible for standardisation and trials of new technologies. They have capabilities and human resources for testing of all kinds of telecom products, services and networks. The regional centres carry out tests and issue service test certificates for telcom products and services.

TEC has a strength of 27 telecom professionals, 94 telecom engineers and 88 support staff for carrying out its responsibilities.

== TEC Certification ==
The TEC issues TEC certificates that cover the listed products. TEC certification has been a voluntary process since 1991. However, as per announcement No. 10-1/2017-IT/TEC/ER, starting in 2019 the TEC will roll out the MTCTE (Mandatory Testing Certification of Telecommunication Equipment) regulations incrementally. Since 2019 many telecommunication products now require a mandatory product certification in India.

Products under the TEC approval scheme will have to meet electromagnetic compatibility (EMC/EMI) limits. The TEC registration process needs to be conducted by an authorised Indian representative. The product must be marked with an ID number (individual factory code), issued by the TEC.
