= Microsoft for Startups =

Microsoft program for entrepreneurs

- Company type: Information Technology Services
- Website type: For Entrepreneur
- Area served: Worldwide
- Owner: Microsoft
- Industry: Entrepreneur
- Services: Azure Credit, other Perks
- Website: startups.microsoft.com
- Launched: February 2018; 8 years ago
- Current status: Active

Microsoft for Startups, formerly known as Microsoft BizSpark, is a Microsoft program that provides support, Azure credits, and free licenses to selected Microsoft products, which are then also provided to software entrepreneurs and start-ups, providing the benefits and the perks to the selected members of this program for a term of 3 years. Microsoft launched BizSpark One in 2009 as an enhanced service for selected startups. The BizSpark program was discontinued on February 14, 2018 and was replaced by the Microsoft for Startups program. In October 2021, a new hub for Founders was added, providing improved oversight of benefits and the startup company profile.
