= Zisman =

Zisman is a surname. Notable people with the surname include:

- Emanuel Zisman (1935–2009), Israeli politician and ambassador
- Julia Zisman (born 1961), Russian-born Israeli painter
- William Zisman (1905–1986), American chemist and geophysicist

== See also ==
- Ziman
