= Voonik =

Online marketplace

Voonik.com
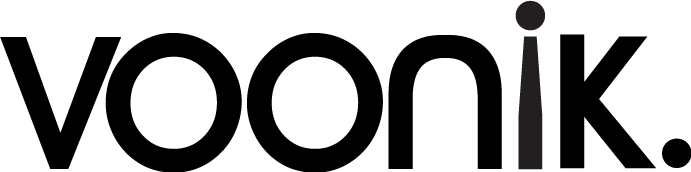
- Website type: E-commerce (Online shopping)
- Founded: 2013
- Headquarters: Bengaluru
- Area served: India
- Founders: Sujayath Ali and Navaneetha Krishnan
- Industry: Ecommerce
- Services: E-commerce (Online shopping)
- Website: www.voonik.com
- Current status: Online

Voonik is an online marketplace operating in products for women's fashion. The company is based in Bengaluru, Karnataka.

The startup was launched as a personal mobile application, before developing a website.

== Background ==
Voonik was founded in 2013 by Sujayath Ali and Navaneetha Krishnan. The company is based in Bengaluru and has 450 employees, as of June 2016. The company had raised $5 million Series A round of funding from Sequoia India in 2015 followed by Series B round $20 million and $6 million from RB Investments in 2017.

== See also ==
- E-commerce in India
- Online shopping
