= N. Seshagiri =

Indian computer scientist

- Born: Narasimaiah Seshagiri; 10 May 1940; India
- Died: 26 May 2013 (aged 73); Bangalore, Karnataka, India
- Education: Indian Institute of Science, Bengaluru
- Occupation: Computer scientist
- Known for: National Informatics Centre
- Awards: Padma Bhushan

Narasimaiah Seshagiri (10 May 1940 – 26 May 2013) was an Indian computer scientist, writer and a former director-general of the National Informatics Centre, an apex organization of the Government of India, handling its e-governance applications. He was a member of the Y2K Action Force of the Government, formed to combat the 9999 computer bug. He is credited with many publications which included The bomb! : fallout of India's nuclear explosion and Information systems for economies in transition. The Government of India awarded him the third highest civilian honour of the Padma Bhushan, in 2005, for his contributions to science and technology.

== See also ==
- National Informatics Centre
