= Sarvam AI =

Indian artificial intelligence company

- Type: Private
- Industry: Artificial intelligence
- Founded: August 2023; 3 years ago
- Founders: Vivek Raghavan; Pratyush Kumar
- Headquarters: Bengaluru, Karnataka, India
- Area served: India
- Products: Large language models; Speech recognition systems; Vision-language models
- Website: www.sarvam.ai

Sarvam AI (lit. 'all' or 'wholeness') is an Indian artificial intelligence company headquartered in Bengaluru, Karnataka. Founded in 2023, the company develops large language models (LLMs) such as Indus and multimodal AI systems with a focus on Indian languages and region-specific use cases.

The company has received venture capital backing and has participated in government-supported AI initiatives, including India's sovereign large language model programme under the IndiaAI Mission.

== History ==
Sarvam AI was founded in August 2023 by Vivek Raghavan and Pratyush Kumar, who were previously associated with AI4Bharat at the Indian Institute of Technology Madras. In December 2023, the company announced a combined seed and Series A funding round of approximately US$41 million. The round was led by Lightspeed Venture Partners, with participation from Peak XV Partners and Khosla Ventures.

In April 2025, the Ministry of Electronics and Information Technology (MeitY) selected Sarvam AI as one of the companies to develop an indigenous foundational model under the IndiaAI Mission. As part of the initiative, the company received access to government-supported computing infrastructure, including GPUs allocated for model training over a specified period.

In February 2026, Sarvam AI introduced two large language models at the AI Impact Summit held at Bharat Mandapam, New Delhi.

In June 2026, Sarvam AI became a unicorn after raising $234 million in its Series B round at a valuation of $1.5 billion. HCLTech invested $150 million in the round as the lead strategic investor.

== Products and technology ==
Indus by Sarvam
- Developer: Sarvam AI
- Release: February 20, 2026; 8 months ago
- Engine: Sarvam-105B
- Type: Artificial intelligence; Virtual assistant; Chatbot
- Website: indus.sarvam.ai

Sarvam AI develops language models trained on datasets that include multiple Indian languages and code-mixed text. The company uses mixture-of-experts (MoE) architectures in some of its models.

=== Foundational language models ===
On 18 February 2026, the company announced the release of two foundational models:

- Sarvam-30B – A 30-billion parameter model based on a mixture-of-experts design. According to company disclosures reported by the media, the model activates approximately 1 billion parameters per token and supports a 32,000-token context window.
- Sarvam-105B – A 105-billion parameter model activating approximately 9 billion parameters per token, with a 128,000-token context window. The model is positioned for complex reasoning and enterprise applications.

On 20 February 2026, the company released a beta version of the Sarvam-105B model which is named Indus. It is available on the Apple App Store, Google Play Store and the web.

=== Speech and vision systems ===
Sarvam AI has also developed multimodal systems including speech-to-text and vision-language models. Its speech model, referred to as Saaras V3 in company materials, supports multiple Indian languages.

The company has also introduced a vision-language model known as Sarvam Vision, intended for document understanding and optical character recognition (OCR) in Indian scripts.

=== Devices ===
'Sarvam Kaze' is an indigenous AI-powered wearable glass that listens, understands, and captures what users see the world through their eyes in real time. The device supports more than 10 Indian languages, enabling voice-based interaction and potentially real-time translation. The company plans to launch the device in May 2026.

== Startup support ==
In March 2026, Sarvam AI launched the Sarvam Startup Program, an initiative providing selected early-stage companies with 6–12 months of API credits scaled to their needs, priority engineering support, and access to production infrastructure for developing multilingual AI applications in areas such as speech, translation, and large language models.

== Open-source release ==
In February 2026, Sarvam AI announced and open-sourced two large language models: Sarvam 30B (30 billion parameters) and Sarvam 105B (105 billion parameters, using a Mixture-of-Experts architecture with 10.3 billion active parameters). Both models were trained from scratch on datasets focused on Indian languages and support advanced reasoning, multilingual tasks, mathematics, and coding. The models are hosted on Hugging Face under the Apache License and are intended for enterprise and developer applications in Indian languages.

The models were subsequently released as open source under the Apache License 2.0, with model weights made available on Hugging Face (sarvamai/sarvam-30b and sarvamai/sarvam-105b) and AIKosh in early March 2026.

== Government and institutional collaborations ==
In 2025, Sarvam AI was selected to contribute to India's sovereign AI model initiative under the IndiaAI Mission. The initiative aims to support domestic AI infrastructure and model development.

In March 2025, the Unique Identification Authority of India (UIDAI) announced a collaboration with Sarvam AI to integrate AI-based voice interactions and multilingual support into Aadhaar-related services.

Sarvam AI has also worked with AI4Bharat and academic institutions on language datasets and speech research projects.

== Industry participation ==
Sarvam AI presented its foundational models at the India AI Impact Summit 2026 in New Delhi. The company has also been listed among Indian members of the AI Alliance, a consortium focused on open-source artificial intelligence initiatives.

== List of models ==
List of Sarvam AI models
Name	Release date	License	Ref.
Sarvam-1	October 2024	Sarvam AI Research	
Sarvam-M	May 2025	Apache 2.0	
Sarvam-105B and Sarvam-30B	February 2026	Apache 2.0	

== See also ==
- List of large language models
- Lists of open-source artificial intelligence software
- Generative artificial intelligence
- Large language model
- Artificial intelligence in India
