= V-Mart Retail =

Indian retail company

V-Mart Retail Limited
- Trade name: V-Mart
- Formerly: Varin Commercial Private Limited (2002–2006); V-Mart Retail Private Limited (2006–2008)
- Company type: Public
- Traded as: NSE: VMART; BSE: 534976
- Industry: Family store
- Founded: 24 July 2002; 23 years ago
- Founder: Lalit Agarwal
- Key people: Aakash Moondhra (Chairperson); Vineet Jain (COO); Anand Agarwal (CFO)
- Website: www.vmart.co.in

V-Mart Retail Limited is Indian retail company which operates a chain of small-size hypermarkets. In 2002 Lalit Agarwal founded this company. Previously it was incorporated as Varin Commercial Private Limited in West Bengal, India.
