= BFSI =

Umbrella term for companies which provide a range of financial products

Banking, financial services and insurance (BFSI) is the industry's umbrella term for companies that provide a range of such financial products or services. This includes universal banks that provide a range of financial services or companies that operate in one or more of these financial sectors. BFSI comprises commercial banks, insurance companies, non-banking financial companies, cooperatives, pensions funds, mutual funds and other smaller financial entities.

The Banking part of BFSI may include core banking, retail, private, wealth, corporate, investment and cards. Financial services may include stock-broking, payment gateways, wallets, mutual funds. Insurance covers life insurance, term insurance and general insurance.

This term is commonly used by information technology (IT), information technology-enabled services (ITES), business process outsourcing (BPO) companies and technical/professional services firms that manage data processing, application testing and software development activities in this domain.

== History ==
The global BFSI Industry faced serious turmoil during the early 21st century, when a series of crises like the subprime mortgage crisis in the US, and the Great Recession worldwide, that began in 2008, gave a huge setback, resulting in negative growth. A 2013 report said that the industry was coming back on track.

== See also ==
- Financial technology (FinTech)
- Alternative financial services
- Online banking
- Open banking
