= Bhashini =

Indian government portal

- Formation: July 2022; 4 years ago
- Type: Governmental project
- Region served: India
- Official language: English, Hindi
- CEO: Shri Amitabh Nag
- Parent organisation: Ministry of Electronics and Information Technology
- Website: bhashini.gov.in

Bhashini is an Indian government project developed by Ministry of Electronics and Information Technology under its "National Language Translation Mission." It aims to help Indian citizens translate content in various Indian languages and enable effective communication among different-language speakers across India, and thus reduce the language barrier in India.

== Background ==
Bhashini was launched at Gandhinagar, Gujarat, in July 2022. The name "Bhashini" is an abbreviation for "Bhasha Interface for India." It is developed under the National Language Translation Mission by Ministry of Electronics and Information Technology.

An Independent Business Division (IBD) called Digital India Bhashini Division (DIBD) has been started under Digital India Corporation (DIC) to help Bhashini ecosystem collab with startups.

== Platform ==
The platform uses Natural language processing and AI, to go beyond language barriers, ensuring digital empowerment and digital inclusion across different states. It has more than 300 pre-trained AI models available to Bhashini ecosystem partners exposed via Open Bhashini APIs.

== Adoption ==
In December 2023, PM Narendra Modi, used Bhashini to translate his realtime speech into for his Tamil audience. Later, Finance Minister Nirmala Sitharaman used the platform during her 2024 Union budget of India speech.

In June 2024, MeitY sought bidders to allow research projects for better accuracy and fluency of machine translation. It promoted use of specific language pairs and use of such domain-specific language models for government, education, healthcare, and other critical sectors.

Bhashini signed MoUs with Snapdeal, Ministry of I&B, Federal Bank among others providing its AI models to cater solutions in vernacular languages.

In September 2024, Open Network for Digital Commerce (ONDC) launched Saarthi, an application that enables businesses to create their own personalised buyer-side applications using Bhashini. Rajasthan government developed Pehchan app, a digital platform that makes birth and death registration easier by enabling voice commands in different languages using Bhashini AI.
