= Viv (software) =

Intelligent personal assistant software

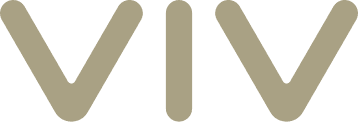
- Developers: Viv Labs, Inc. (subsidiary of Samsung Electronics)
- Type: Intelligent personal assistant
- Website: viv.ai

Viv is a discontinued intelligent personal assistant created by the developers of Siri.

== History ==
It debuted on May 9, 2016, at TechCrunch Disrupt New York. Compared to Siri, the software's platform is open and can accommodate external plug-ins written to work with the assistant. It can also handle more complex queries. The development team has been working on the software since 2012 and had raised over $22 million in funding by early 2015 and $30 million by early 2016.

On October 5, 2016, the software and its developer, Viv Labs, Inc. (formerly Six Five Labs, Inc.) was acquired by Samsung Electronics.

The following month, it was revealed that a personal assistant software would be available on the Samsung Galaxy S8 and S8+. This, however, turned out to be Bixby, which was a relaunch of S Voice, rather than based on Viv. In October 2017, Samsung announced Viv Labs technology would be integrated into Bixby 2.0.

== Patents ==
- Mark Gabel, Christopher Brigham, Adam Cheyer, Dag Kittlaus. "US 20140380263 A1: Dynamically evolving cognitive architecture system based on third-party developers". Six Five Labs, Inc. Google Patents.
- Mark Gabel, Christopher Brigham, Adam Cheyer. "US 20140380268 A1: Dynamically evolving cognitive architecture system planning". Six Five Labs, Inc. Google Patents.
- Mark Gabel, Christopher Brigham, Adam Cheyer. "US 20140380285 A1: Dynamically evolving cognitive architecture system based on a natural language intent interpreter". Six Five Labs, Inc. Google Patents.
- Mark Gabel, Christopher Brigham, Adam Cheyer. "US 20140379615 A1: Dynamically evolving cognitive architecture system based on prompting for additional user input". Six Five Labs, Inc. Google Patents.

== See also ==
- Amazon Alexa
- Bixby (virtual assistant)
- Cortana (software)
- Google Assistant
- Mycroft
- Siri
- Clova (virtual assistant)
