= INDIAai =

National AI portal of India

- Country: India
- Prime Minister(s): Narendra Modi
- Established: 07 March 2024
- Status: Active
- Website: indiaai.gov.in

INDIAai is a web portal launched by the Government of India on 7 March 2024 for artificial intelligence-related developments in India. It is known as the National AI Portal of India, which was jointly started by the Ministry of Electronics and Information Technology (MeitY), the National e-Governance Division (NeGD) and the National Association of Software and Service Companies (NASSCOM), with support from the Department of School Education and Literacy (DoSE&L) and the Ministry of Human Resource Development.

== History ==
The portal was launched on 30 May 2020, by Ravi Shankar Prasad, the Union Minister for Electronics and IT, Law and Justice and Communications, on the first anniversary of the second tenure of Prime Minister Narendra Modi-led government. A national program for the youth, 'Responsible AI for Youth', was also launched on the same day.

As of 2022, the website was visited by more than 4.5 lakh users with 1.2 million page views. It has 1151 articles on artificial intelligence, 701 news stories, 98 reports, 95 case studies and 213 videos on its portal. It maintains a database on AI ecosystem of India featuring 121 government initiatives and 281 startups. In May 2022, INDIAai released a book titled 'AI for Everyone' that covers the basics of AI.

IndiaAI is an Independent Business Division (IBD) of the Digital India Corporation (DIC). The Union Cabinet has approved the project and a budget of ₹10,371.92 crore.

== Objective and features ==
It aims to function as a one-stop portal for all AI-related development in India. The platform publishes resources such as articles, news, interviews, and investment funding news and events for AI startups, AI companies, and educational firms related to AI in India. It also distributes documents, case studies, and research reports. Additionally, the platform provides education and employment opportunities related to AI. It offers AI courses, both free and paid.
