= Shōji Hayashi =

Japanese architect

Shōji Hayashi (林 昌二, Hayashi Shōji) (23 September 1928 – 30 November 2011) was a Japanese architect. As chief architect of Nikken Sekkei, Ltd., he designed many notable buildings, including the Palaceside Building in Tokyo, which was selected as one of 20 works of modern Japanese architecture by Docomomo Japan. He was chairman of the Japan Institute of Architects (1990–1992) and an honorary fellow of the American Institute of Architects.

== Career ==
Hayashi was born in Tokyo. He studied architecture under Seike Kiyoshi at the Tokyo Institute of Technology. After graduating in 1953, he joined Nikken Sekkei, Japan's largest independent architectural design firm, where he was chief architect for many years and later Vice President and Vice Chairman.

== Notable works ==
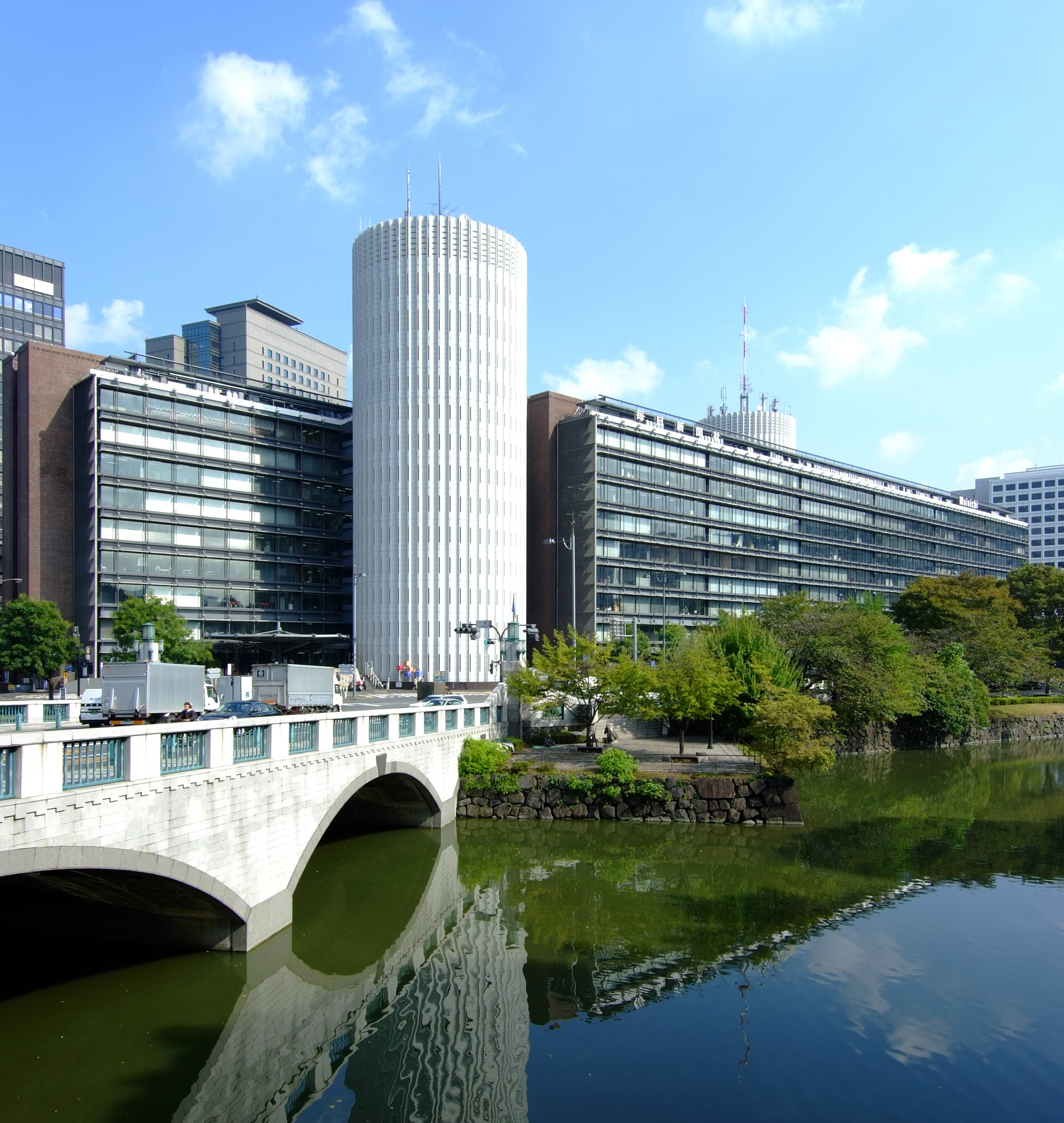
Palaceside Building (1964)

- San'ai Dream Center (1963)
- Palaceside Building (1964)
- Nagano Prefectural Shinano Art Museum (1964)
- Pola Gotanda Building (1971)
- IBM Japan Headquarters Building (1971)
- Nakano Sun Plaza (1973)
- Shinjuku NS Building (1982)
- Toyota Automobile Museum (1989)
- NEC Supertower (1990)
- Kakegawa City Office (1996)
- Bunkyo Civic Center (2000)
- Pola Museum of Art (2002)
