= Shiba, Tokyo =

Area of Minato ward in Tokyo, Japan

Coordinates: 35.6486°N 139.7470°E

Shiba (芝) is an area of Minato ward in Tokyo, Japan and one of districts in the Shiba area.

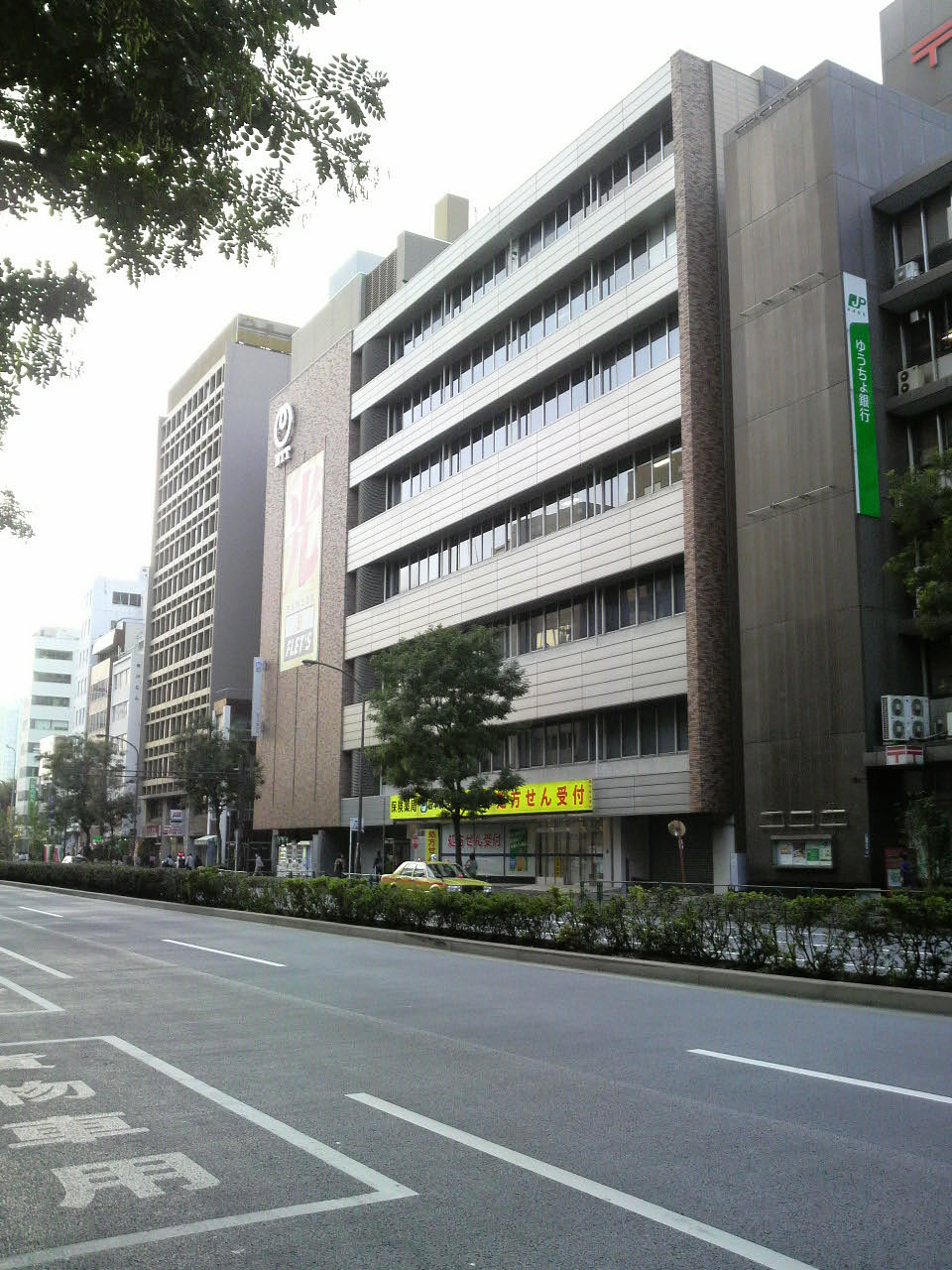
The Japan Shiba Telephone Office

== Shiba area ==
Shiba was a ward of Tokyo City from 1878 to 1947. It was merged with Akasaka and Azabu wards to form Minato ward on March 15, 1947. The Shiba area (芝地域) is located in the eastern and southern parts of Minato ward and consisting of a number of districts including Atago, Kaigan, Kōnan, Shiba, Shiba-kōen, Shibaura, Shiba-daimon, Shirokane, Shirokanedai, Shinbashi, Daiba, Takanawa, Toranomon, Nishi-Shinbashi, Hamamatsuchō, Higashi-Shinbashi (aka Shiodome) and Mita.

The main office of Minato ward and Zōjō-ji temple, the Great Main Temple of the Chinzei sect of Jōdo-shū, are located in Shiba-kōen.

== Shiba area (administrative) ==
Minato City Office has 5 regional city offices: Shiba, Azabu, Akasaka, Takanawa and Shiba Kōnan. The Shiba Regional City Office (芝総合支所) administrates the following districts/neighborhoods: Atago, Kaigan 1 chōme, Shiba, Shiba-kōen, Shiba-daimon, Shinbashi, Toranomon, Nishi-shinbashi, Hamamatsuchō, Nishi-shinbashi and Mita 1-3 chōme. As of 1 January 2017, the Shiba area has a population of 40,304 living in 25,339 households.

== Shiba district ==
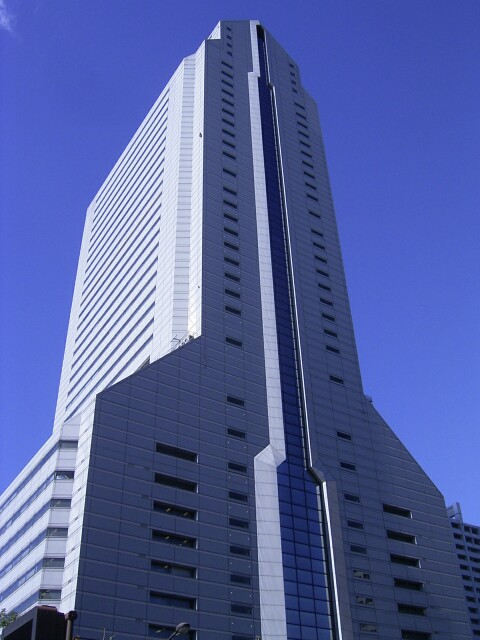
The NEC Supertower

Shiba (芝) district is located in an eastern part of the Shiba area. On 1 July 1964, Shiba district (Shiba 1-5 chōme, 芝一〜五丁目) was created by merging and renaming the following districts/neighborhoods: Shibakanasugi (芝金杉一〜四丁目), Shibakanasugikawaguchichō (芝金杉川口町), Shibakanasugihamachō (芝金杉浜町), Shibakanasugigashi (芝金杉河岸), Shibashinborichō (芝新堀町), Shibashinborigashi (芝新堀河岸), Shibasaiōjimachi (芝西応寺町), Shibatamachi (芝田町一〜四丁目), Shibayokoshinmachi (芝横新町), Shibamatsumotochō (芝松本町), a part of Shibatorishinmachi (芝通新町), Honshiba (本芝一〜四丁目), Honshibamokuzaichō (本芝材木町), Honshibashitamachi (本芝下町), Honshibairiyokochō (本芝入横町), Shibamitashikokumachi (芝三田四国町) and Shibamitadobōchō (芝三田同朋町). As of 1 January 2017, the district (Shiba 1-5 chōme) has a population of 13,684 and 8,089 households. Tamachi Stations on the Yamanote Line and Mita Station on the Toei Mita Line are located in Shiba 5 chōme.

=== Economy ===
Companies based in Shiba district include:

- Bandai Namco Holdings
- Haseko
- Korean Air Japan
- Morinaga
- NEC (NEC Supertower)

=== Education ===
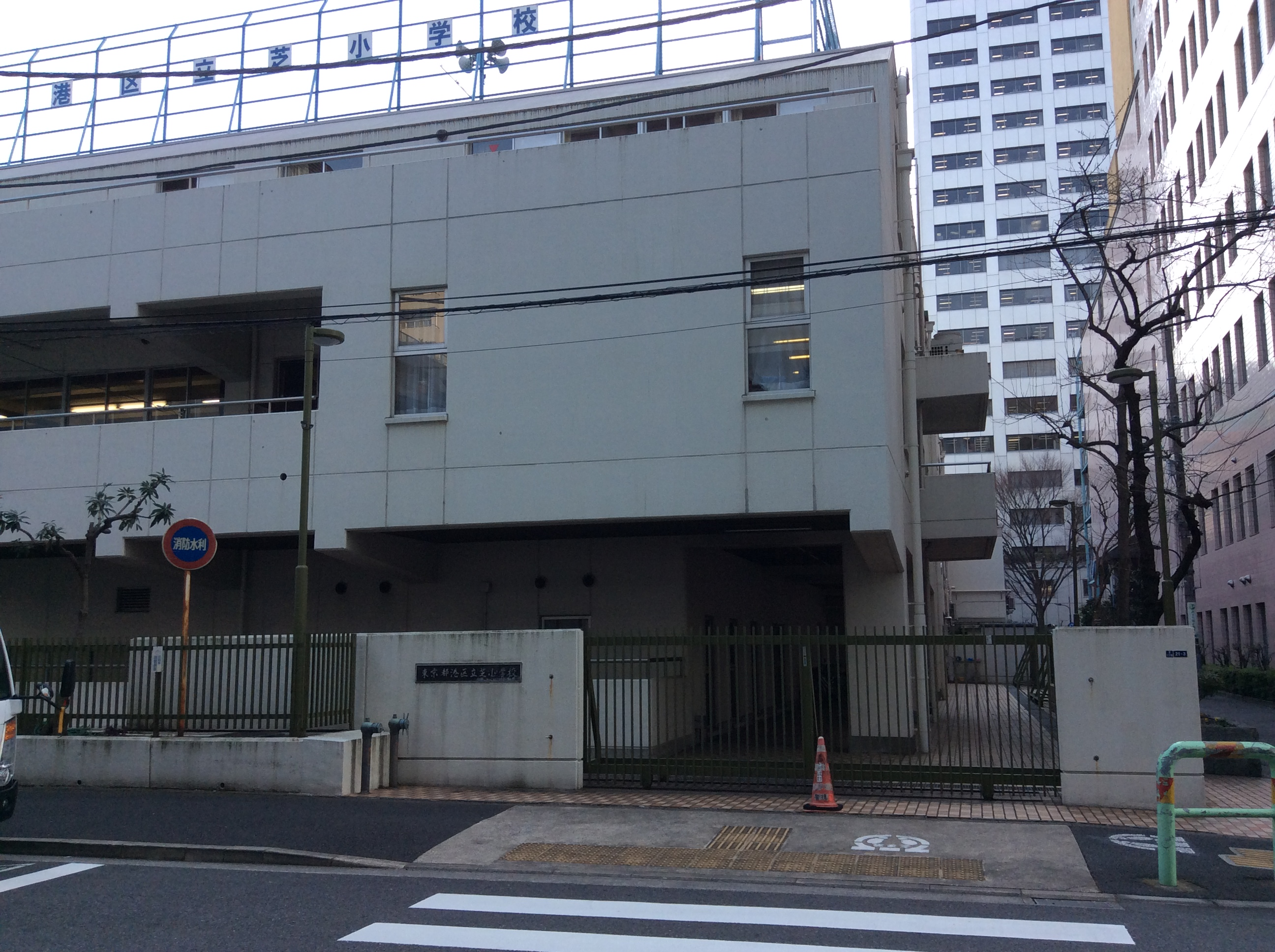
Shiba Elementary School (芝小学校)

Minato City Board of Education operates public elementary and junior high schools.

Shiba 1, 2, and 4-chōme and 4-6-ban of 3-chōme are zoned to Shiba Elementary School (芝小学校) 1-3 and 7-43-ban of 3-chome are zoned to Akabane Elementary School (赤羽小学校). 5-chome is zoned to Mita Elementary School (御田小学校). All of Shiba is zoned to Mita Junior High School (港区立三田中学校).

Schools in Shiba:

- Shiba Elementary School (public, operated by the Minato City Board of Education, 港区立芝小学校)
- Tokyo Joshi Gakuen Junior & Senior High School (private)
- Toita Women's College (private)

Minato City Library operates Mita Library in Shiba.

=== Embassies ===
- Republic of Chile
- Republic of Botswana
