= Qontis =

Online personal finance platform based in Switzerland

- Industry: Personal Finance Management
- Founded: 2013
- Founder: Neue Zürcher Zeitung, Crealogix
- Headquarters: Switzerland
- Key people: Christian Bieri (CEO); Nils Reimelt (CMO); Walter Meister (Board of Directors)
- Products: Personal finance management solutions, online financial content
- Website: qontis.ch

Qontis is a Switzerland based online personal finance management (PFM) platform. The service is part of a commercial enterprise between the Neue Zürcher Zeitung media property and e-banking solutions provider Crealogix. The platform provides users with the ability to document and organize data from all instances of private income and expenditures. Qontis' CEO (chief executive officer) is Christian Bieri, who formerly served as the Austrian Country Manager and CEE for the Vienna branch of Avaloq Evolution AG. The company's CMO (chief marketing officer) is Nils Reimelt, the former digital director at Ringier Axel Springer Media AG. In March 2014, Qontis developed a personal Finance Manager, which should be able to access the data of almost all Swiss ("multibanking").

== Features ==
In addition to providing an overview of personal finance details, some of the features that Qontis offers include budgeting tools that can analyze a user's transaction history, cost optimization suggestions, and capital accumulation support.

=== Online magazine ===
Qontis also publishes an online magazine with editorial contributions that are relevant to the financial areas of planning, saving, and spending. The content is intended to assist users in improving their daily spending habits. Qontis released the first issue of its magazine in the summer of 2013, approximately three months before the platform itself was available.

== Partnerships ==
The venture between the NZZ and Crealogix has led to partnerships with companies such as Comparis, MoneyPark, and MyDepotCheck.
