= Front-facing camera =

Sensor on mobile devices designed to record the user

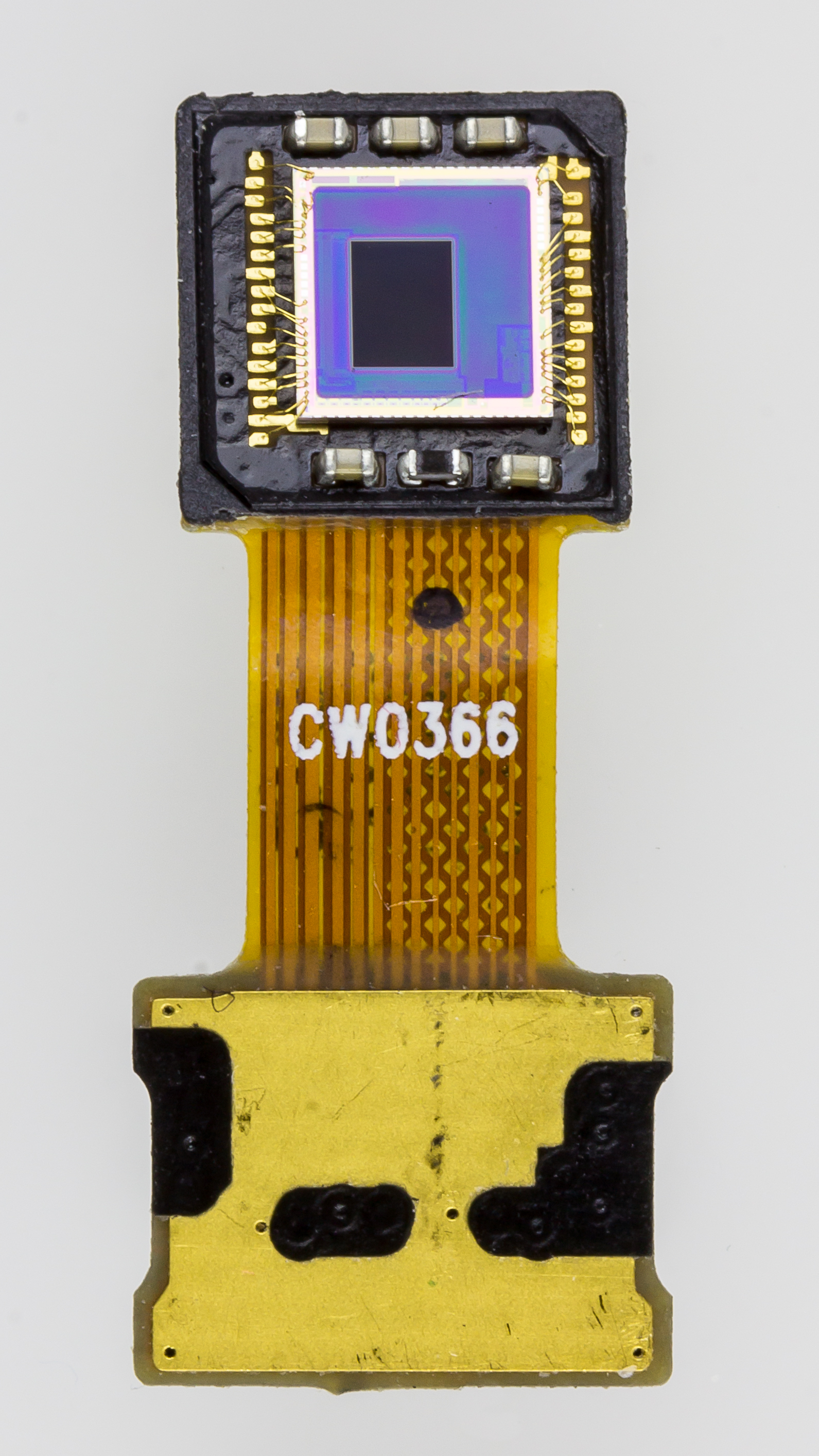
Front-facing camera with connector of LG Optimus L7 II

A front-facing camera, commonly known as a selfie camera, is a common feature of cameras, mobile phones, smartphones, tablets, laptops, and some handheld video game consoles. While stand-alone cameras face forward, away from the operator, tablets, smartphones and similar mobile devices typically have a camera facing the operator to allow taking a self-portrait photograph or video while looking at the display of the device, usually showing a live preview of the image. These are called front-facing cameras and are important for videotelephony and the taking of selfies. Often, the preview image is by default a mirror image, which is more intuitive for most people; this default can be overridden, and in any case the recorded image is not reversed.

== History ==
While not a dedicated front-facing camera, the Casio QV-10 digital camera featured a lens that rotated 180 degrees. Introduced in 1995 it was the first consumer digital camera with a color LCD. This allowed for the user to point the camera at themself while viewing the LCD.

Perhaps the first front-facing camera on a hand-held device was the Game Boy Camera, released in Japan in February 1998. The Game Boy Camera was an attachment for Game Boy.

The first front-facing camera phone was the Kyocera Visual Phone VP-210, released in Japan in May 1999. It was called a "mobile videophone" at the time, and had a 110,000-pixel front-facing camera. It stored up to 20 JPEG digital images, which could be sent over e-mail, or the phone could send up to two images per second over Japan's Personal Handy-phone System (PHS) Wireless cellular network.

Several mobile phones with front-facing cameras were released to Western markets in 2003, including the NEC e606, NEC e616, Sony Ericsson Z1010 and Motorola A835. The front-facing camera was originally intended for video-conferencing. The Motorola A920 was released in 2003 as well and may have been the first smartphone with a front-facing camera.

The first iPhone to include a front-facing camera was the iPhone 4.

In May 2017, the Essential Phone introduced the notch - the removal of part of the display to accommodate the front-facing camera. The iPhone X popularized this concept after its introduction in late 2017. As of 2019, several smartphones incorporate front cameras that pop up from within the smartphone to allocate the area that would be otherwise utilized by notches to the screen. Under-display cameras are under development, which would place a camera under a special display that would allow the camera to see through the display.
