= CSG Systems =

Corporation in Colorado, US

CSG
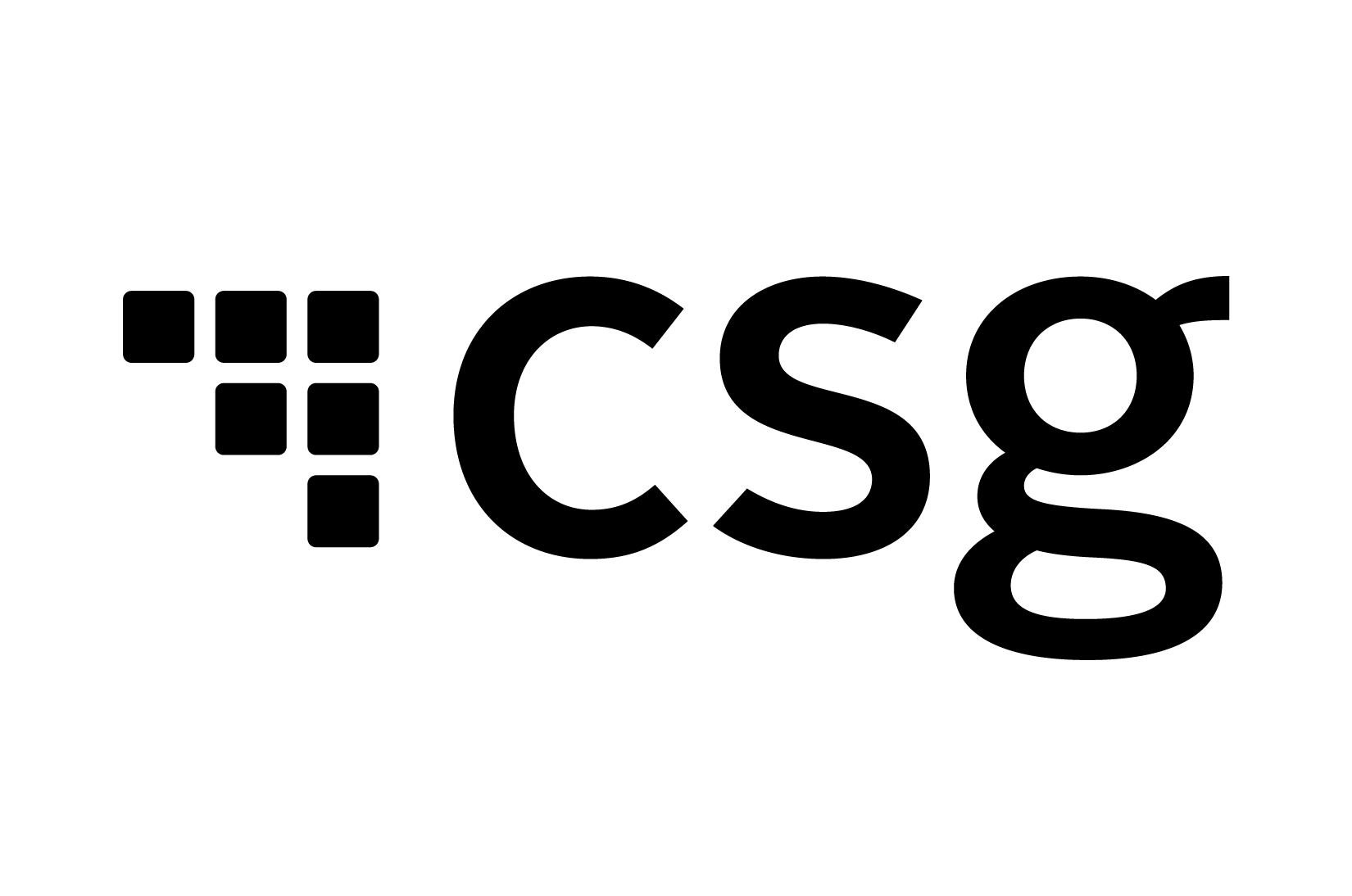

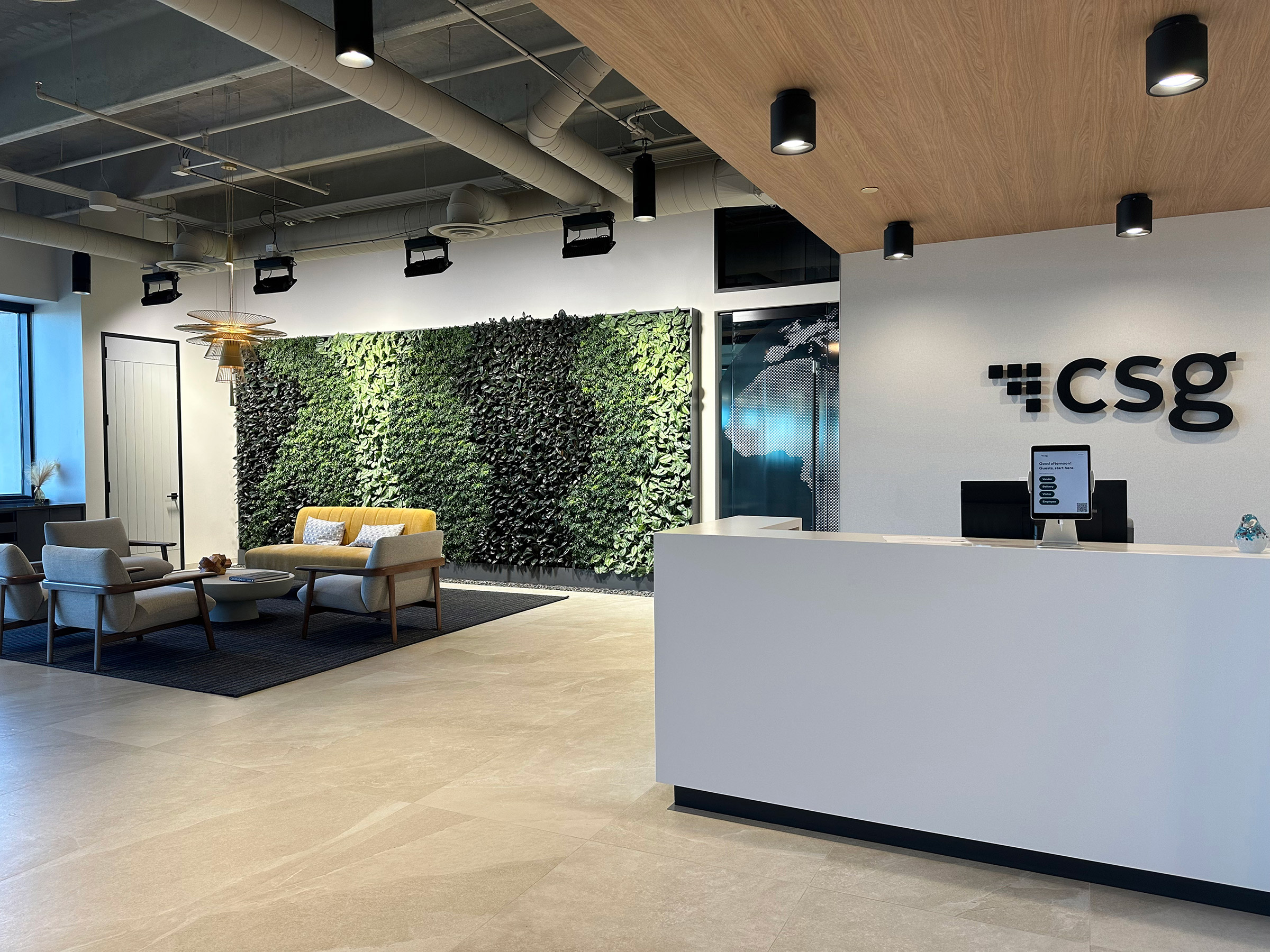
- CSG's headquarters in Colorado
- Type: Subsidiary
- Traded as: Nasdaq: CSGS
- Founded: 1982, Omaha, Nebraska, U.S.
- Founder: Neal Hansen and George Haddix
- Headquarters: Englewood, Colorado, U.S.
- Area served: Worldwide
- Key people: Brian Shepherd (CEO)
- Products: Business support system (BSS); Customer interaction management Digital monetization Revenue and customer management Customer experience Payments
- Revenue: $1.223 billion (2025)
- Operating income: $118.7 million (2025)
- Net income: $55.9 million (2025)
- Total assets: $1,544.6 million (2025)
- Total equity: $283.7 million (2025)
- Number of employees: 7,700 (2026)
- Parent: NEC Corporation
- Website: csgi.com

CSG is a multinational corporation headquartered in Englewood, Colorado. It provides business support systems (BSS) software and services, primarily to the telecommunications industry.

CSG was founded by Neal Hansen as a division of First Data in 1982. It became an independent corporation when it was acquired by CSG Holdings in 1994 for $137 million. A contract with Tele-Communications Inc. (TCI), the largest cable TV business at the time, was influential in the company's growth from $80 million in revenue in 1994 to $171 million by 1997. CSG went public in 1996. A dispute with TCI over pricing led to a $120 million arbitration settlement in 2002 with Comcast, who acquired the TCI business. The two continued to do business together and expanded their relationship in 2014. CSG made more than ten acquisitions in the 2000s, mostly of companies that sold billing, customer service, and operations software.

In October 2025, Japanese multinational NEC Corporation announced the acquisition of CSG. This acquisition was completed in May 2026.

== Corporate history ==
=== Early history ===
CSG was founded in 1982 by Neal Hansen under the name Cable Services Group (CSG) as a division of the payment processing company First Data Corporation. At the time, First Data was operated by American Express, which acquired a controlling interest in the company in 1980. CSG became a part of the American Express Information Services Company, which was formed in 1989. The CSG group's first large-scale billing statement processing center, which prints and mails bills to consumers, was established in Omaha in 1990.

Hansen left the Cable Services Group one year after it was founded to become CEO of Applied Communications, where he met George Haddix. Hansen and Haddix formed CSG Holdings with Morgan Stanley and Trident Investment Group in 1994, which acquired Cable Services Group that year for $137 million. In November 1994, Cable Services Group was renamed to CSG Systems International.

CSG was the second largest billing services provider for the US cable television industry by 1994, serving 27 percent of cable TV subscribers. However, according to The International Directory of Company Histories, its profit margins were small and the company was "still in need of a turnaround." Broadcasting & Cable said CSG had lost direction and become complacent. Haddix and Hansen implemented changes at the company, which prompted 350 out of 500 employees to leave the firm within a few months.

The new CSG grew quickly. The convergence of phone, internet, on-demand movies, and other services created more complex billing arrangements between telecommunications companies and consumers, which led to more extensive use of billing services providers like CSG. Professional services and international clients, which were previously not a significant portion of revenues, grew to 22 percent of revenues by the mid-1990s.

=== Post IPO ===
In order to pay off debt and raise funding for acquisitions, CSG held an initial public offering in February 1996, which valued the firm at five-fold its original acquisition price. CSG grew from $80 million in annual revenue when it was acquired, to $132.3 million when it went public in 1996 and $171.7 million by 1997.

In the 1990s, Tele-Communications Inc. (TCI) and Time Warner scrapped efforts to create internal billing software and hired CSG International. The 15-year agreement CSG signed with TCI on August 11, 1997 made CSG the largest vendor in the industry and was the primary contributor to its growth in the '90s. By 2001, the deal was responsible for 45 percent of CSG's revenue. As part of the deal, CSG also acquired TCI's internally developed software, SummiTrack, for $106 million. CSG's services to TCI included billing, customer management, and payment processing for TCI customers. In October 1997, CSG International signed its first deal with a utilities company, mc2.

At the end of 1997, CSG co-founder George Haddix retired, and former EVP Jack Pogge was appointed president and chief operating officer in his place. In 1999, CSG began constructing a new bill processing center in Florida in a deal with local government, which expanded roads and provided other incentives. In 2002, CSG acquired the billing software interests of Lucent Technologies for $260 million. The deal was estimated to increase CSG's revenues by 38 percent and its headcount by 65 percent. 200 Lucent employees were laid off as a result of the acquisition. An additional 100–150 CSG employees were laid off later that year in response to poor economic conditions.

=== Recent history ===
AT&T acquired TCI in 2000, inheriting its agreement with CSG. AT&T alleged CSG was not abiding by the contract's terms to provide favorable rates. A legal dispute between the two companies began in 2001 in arbitration court. Before the dispute was resolved, AT&T Broadband was acquired by Comcast, which wanted to use its own billing and customer service vendor. In October 2002, a judge ruled that CSG owed Comcast a $120 million refund and that it had to reduce its prices. The two companies disagreed over whether the ruling would allow Comcast to halt their agreement before the end of its term. CSG and Comcast reached new agreements or extensions in March 2004 and in 2008. In 2014, its work with Comcast was expanded to cover all of its customer support and billing for residential services.

In March 2005, co-founder Neal Hansen retired at the age of 64. Ed Nafus, prior president of the broadband services division, took his place. Nafus was replaced as CEO by Peter Kalan, at the end of 2007. In November 2015, it was announced that Bret Griess would be succeeding Kalan as president and CEO. In August 2020, Brian Shepherd took over as president and CEO.

As of December 31, 2019, CSG operates across more than 120 countries worldwide and has a total of 4,339 employees, an increase of 374 employees compared to the previous year.'

In October 2025, the Japan-based NEC Corporation announced the acquisition of CSG for $80.70 per share in cash, for a total enterprise value of approximately $2.9 billion. This acquisition was completed in May 2026.

== Acquisitions ==
Date	Company	Business	Deal size	References
1980	CSG parent company First Data acquired by American Express	Payments processing		
1994	Cable Services Group acquired by CSG Holdings	Bill processing for cable TV operators	$137 million	
1996	Bytel Limited	Customer management software	$4.7 million	
1997	TCI's SummiTrack	Billing software	$106 million	
1998	US Telecom Advanced Technology Systems	Billing and customer service	$6 million	
2001	Athene Software	Customer analytics software	Not disclosed	
2001	PlaNet Consulting	e-commerce consulting	Not disclosed	
2002	Kenan Systems assets from Lucent Technologies	Billing and customer service software	$260 million	
2002	Integrated Customer Management Systems (ICMS), an IBM division	Customer service software	$15 million (estimated)	
2005	CSG Global Software & Services division (formerly Kenan) acquired by Comverse Technology	Billing and customer service software	$251 million	
2006	Telution	Operations software	$22 million	
2007	Prairie Voice Services	Interactive messaging services	$39 million	
2007	ComTec	Bill processing	$23.5 million	
2008	DataProse	Direct mail and bill processing	$39 million	
2009	Quaero (later divested in December 2013)	Marketing services firm	$15 million	
2010	Intec Telecom	Billing software	$392 million	
2012	Ascade	Wholesale billing software	$19 million	
2013	Volubill (certain assets)	Policy and billing management software	Not disclosed	
2018	Business Ink, Co.	Strategic business communications	$70 million	
2018	Forte Payment Systems, Inc.	Payment processor	$85 million	
2020	Tekzenit/Gen Design Studio	Strategy, Design Engineering and Technology Enablement	$10 million	
2021	Quaero 3, LLC	Customer Data Platform	Not disclosed	
2021	Tango Telecom	Realtime monetisation and roaming technology	Not disclosed	
2021	DGIT Systems	Quote Order Bill software	Not disclosed	
2021	Kitewheel	Customer Experience Management software	Not disclosed	

== Products, software, and services ==
CSG provides software and services for managing customer data, analyzing that data, billing, and customer service. For example, customer service representatives may use CSG systems to look up a consumer's records and add a new service, or business analysts may mine customer data for trends. According to the company's website, its primary product areas are digital monetization, revenue and customer management, and customer experience. CSG also prints and mails billing statements to consumers and provides call-center services.

=== Product history ===
CSG originally sold two versions of its billing process outsourcing services. Under new leadership in 1994, it began developing additional software and providing consulting to in-house billing departments. During this period, it developed CSG Workforce Express® (now Field Service Management), a suite of software products that manage the dispatch of technicians and other logistics at customer sites. Workforce Express consists of three applications: CSG Workforce Management, CSG TechNet and CSG TechNet CE, which integrate with CSG's databases and billing systems. It also developed CSG Care Express, which is for creating online self-service portals for consumers to view and pay their bills online.

In the 1990s, CSG introduced the ACSR (Advanced Customer Service Representative) system. An extension to ACSR called ProfitNow! was introduced in 2003. ProfitNow! used a consumer's account data to advise customer service representatives on the likelihood of a caller cancelling their service or buying a new product. It was later turned into an online system with a user interface similar to Microsoft Windows at CSG.net. CSG purchased the Kenan FX software from Lucent Technologies in 2002. Kenan software managed billing and ordering and provided middle-ware to help various customer service and billing products integrate with each other. CSG NextGen was introduced for international markets, with support for multiple languages. In March 2014, CSG added a cybersecurity suite to its product portfolio, under the name CSG Invotas. The company released CSG Ascendon®, a digital platform for communications service providers, in March 2015. The platform uses content monetization and delivery systems without making excessive changes to existing infrastructure. In November 2015, the Invotas unit was spun off into a separate entity. Invotas was acquired by FireEye in a transaction that closed February 1, 2016.

The company released CSG Detect, a software as a service (SaaS) system, in February 2019. The system is aimed at detecting and notifying telecommunications companies real-time of potential fraud in their billing process. In July 2019, the company introduced CSG Field Service Management, a cloud-based advancement of its Workforce Express product suite. CSG Field Service Management is part of the company's Customer Communication Management portfolio, which customers use to send over 1.5 billion messages to their end-users each year. The company announced the availability of its Dispute Reconciliation Management system (DRM) in September 2019. The system provides service providers with the tools and support to automate the reconciliation and dispute process. CSG Dispute Reconciliation Management is a part of the company's digital Wholesale suite of products and systems. The company introduced Ascendon Communications, the industry's first software as a service (SaaS)-delivered, cloud-based business support systems (BSS) system, in October 2019.

In April 2019, CSG announced the opening of a technology lab to adopt blockchain technology across the wholesale business support systems (BSS) industry. In May 2019, the company announced the availability of its Mediation platform as a cloud-based system. In June 2019, CSG and ITW Global Leaders' Forum (GLF) announced a partnership to create an open blockchain ecosystem called the Communications Blockchain Network (CBN).

In March 2020, Forte®, a CSG company, announced its BillPay system including omnichannel accessibility, payer-friendly navigation, biller customization, and advanced tech.

== Organization ==
CSG parent company, CSG Systems International Inc., is listed on the NASDAQ stock exchange. As of 2020, its largest clients are Comcast and Charter, representing 23 and 20 percent of its revenues respectively. CSG spends approximately 13 percent of its revenue on research and development. Its revenue is about 89 percent from cloud and related services, 5 percent from software, and the remainder for ongoing technical support. 68.6 percent of revenues is from the Americas.
