= J/TPS-102 =

Japanese radar

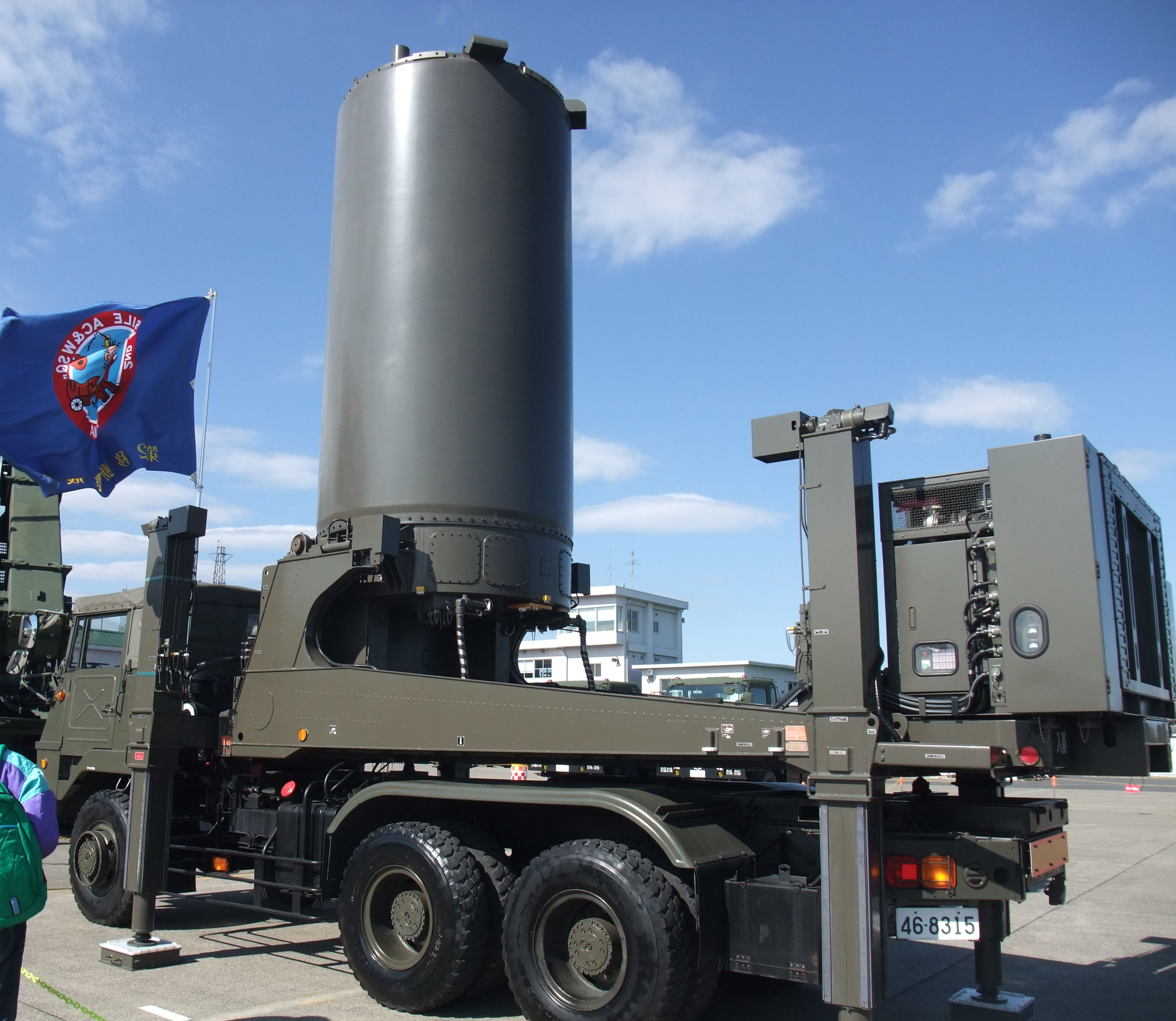
- The J/TPS-102 device of the Central Aircraft Control and Warning Wing
- Country of origin: Japan
- Manufacturer: NEC
- Introduced: 1992
- Type: 3D radar

J/TPS-102 is a radar currently deployed by the Japan Air Self-Defense Force for airspace monitoring. It is a 3D radar manufactured by NEC.

== Introduction ==
It is by design a cylindrical active phased array antenna. It utilizes an omnidirectional and elevation electronic scanning system to improve target acquisition and targeting capabilities and the overall ECCM performance compared to conventional mobile radars.Automatic connection with the JASDF's automatic surveillance and control apparatus is possible, as demonstrated. A typical system consists of the monitoring device (the radar itself), the data relay device and the command system. The preliminary manufacturing contract was executed from fiscal year 1989 to fiscal year 2000.Its structure makes it less susceptible to bad weather. Plus, it has been confirmed that the emitted radio waves have no effect on the human body.

== Deployment ==
- Northern Aircraft Control and Warning Wing
  - 1st Mobile Aircraft Control and Warning Squadron（Chitose Air Base）
- Central Aircraft Control and Warning Wing
  - 2nd Mobile Aircraft Control and Warning Squadron（Iruma Air Base）
- Western Aircraft Control and Warning Wing
  - 3rd Mobile Aircraft Control and Warning Squadron（Kasuga Air Base）
- Southwestern Aircraft Control & Warning Wing
  - 4th Mobile Aircraft Control and Warning Squadron（Naha Airport）
  - 第53警戒隊与那国分遣班（Camp Yonaguni）
