= NEC =

Japanese technology corporation

NEC Corporation
- Logo since 1992

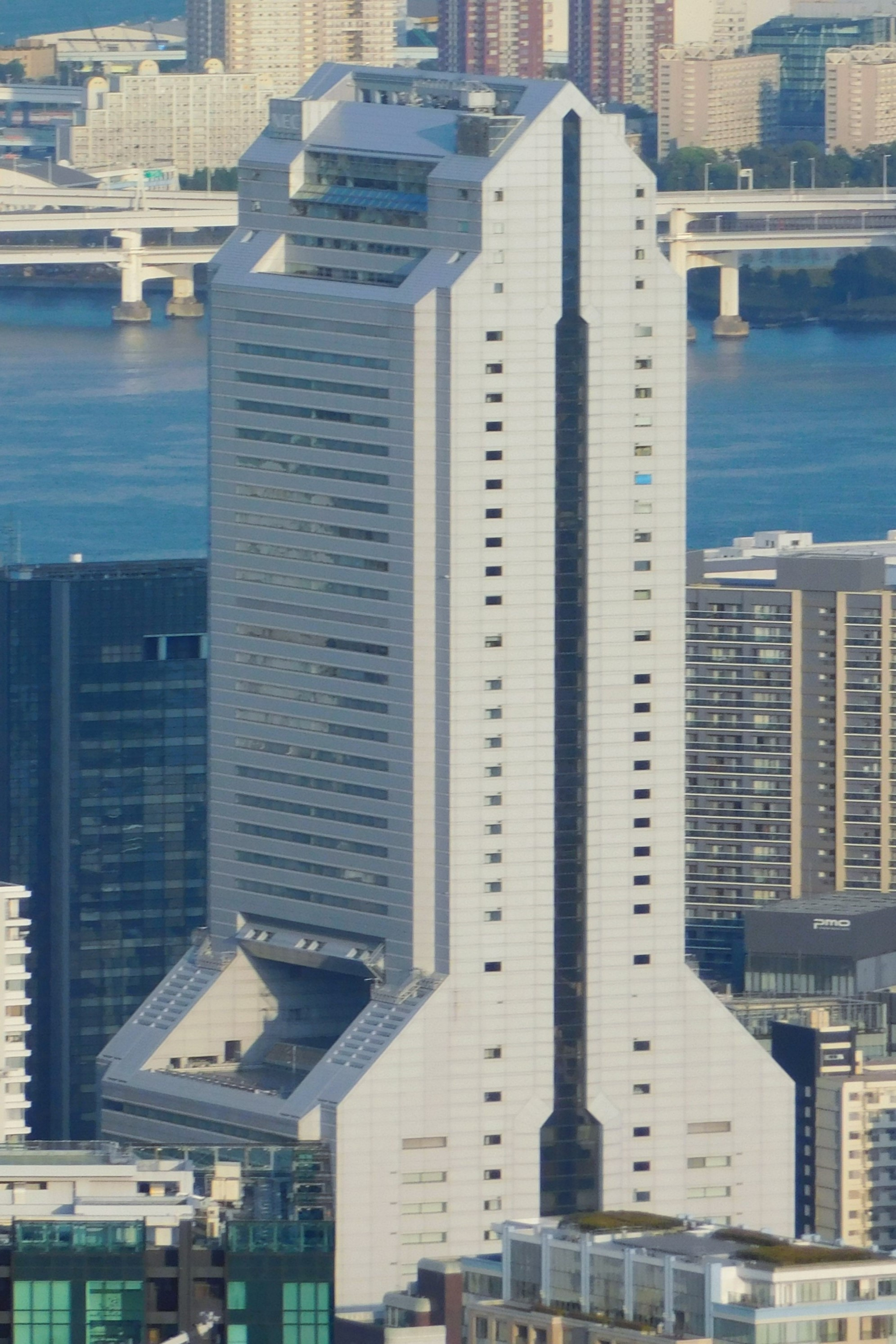
- Headquarters at the NEC Supertower in Minato, Tokyo, Japan
- Native name: 日本電気株式会社
- Romanized name: Nippon Denki Kabushiki gaisha
- Formerly: Nippon Electric Company, Limited (1899–1983, in English)
- Type: Public
- Traded as: TYO: 6701
- ISIN: JP3733000008
- Industry: Conglomerate; Information technology; Telecommunications; Aerospace & defense
- Founded: 17 July 1899; 127 years ago (as Nippon Electric Company, Limited) in Tokyo, Japan
- Headquarters: NEC Supertower, Shiba, Minato, Tokyo, Japan
- Area served: Worldwide
- Key people: Takashi Niino (chairman); Takayuki Morita (president)
- Products: Biometric authentication systems; Supercomputers; Enterprise servers; Artificial satellites; Submarine cable systems; Telecommunications equipment; Enterprise software
- Services: Digital transformation (NEC BluStellar); System integration; IT consulting; Cloud computing; Managed services; Cybersecurity
- Revenue: ▼¥3.42 trillion (US$21.62 billion) (FY2025)
- Operating income: ▲¥311.3 billion (US$1.97 billion) (FY2025)
- Net income: ▲¥225.7 billion (US$1.43 billion) (FY2025)
- Total assets: ▲¥4.41 trillion (US$27.87 billion) (FY2025)
- Total equity: ▼¥2.07 trillion (US$13.08 billion) (FY2025)
- Number of employees: 104,194 (2025)
- Parent: NEC Group
- Subsidiaries: List: Avaloq; CSG International; Japan Aviation Electronics (24%); NEC Brasil; NEC Corporation of America; NEC Europe; NEC Laboratories America; NEC Software Solutions; NEC Solution Innovators; NEC X; Netcracker Technology
- Website: nec.com

NEC Corporation (日本電気株式会社, Nippon Denki Kabushiki gaisha; an acronym for Nippon Electric Company) is a Japanese multinational conglomerate corporation headquartered at the NEC Supertower in Minato, Tokyo, Japan. It sells IT and network services, including cloud computing, artificial intelligence (AI), Internet of Things (IoT) platform, and telecommunications equipment and software to business enterprises, communications services providers and to government agencies. It is one of the five largest defense contractors in Japan.

NEC was one of the world's largest personal computer and semiconductor manufacturers from the 1980s to the 2000s, but has largely withdrawn from manufacturing since the beginning of the 21st century, having spun off its PC business to Lenovo and its semiconductor business to Renesas Electronics and Elpida Memory.

NEC is a member of the Sumitomo Group.

== History ==
=== Overview ===
Kunihiko Iwadare and Takeshiro Maeda established Nippon Electric Limited Partnership on 31 August 1898, by using facilities that it had bought from Miyoshi Electrical Manufacturing Company. Iwadare acted as the representative partner; Maeda handled company sales. Western Electric, which had an interest in the Japanese phone market, was represented by Walter Tenney Carleton. Carleton was also responsible for the renovation of the Miyoshi facilities. It was agreed that the partnership would be reorganized as a joint-stock company when the treaty would allow it. On 17 July 1899, the revised treaty between Japan and the United States went into effect. Nippon Electric Company, Limited was organized the same day as Western Electric Company to become the first Japanese joint-venture with foreign capital. Iwadare was named managing director. Ernest Clement and Carleton were named as directors. Maeda and Mototeru Fujii were assigned to be auditors. Iwadare, Maeda, and Carleton handled the overall management.

The company started with the production, sales, and maintenance of telephones and switches. NEC modernized the production facilities with the construction of the Mita Plant in 1901 at Mita Shikokumachi. It was completed in December 1902.

The Japanese Ministry of Communications adopted a new technology in 1903: the common battery switchboard supplied by NEC. The common battery switchboards powered the subscriber phone, eliminating the need for a permanent magnet generator in each subscriber's phone. The switchboards were initially imported, but were manufactured locally by 1909.

NEC started exporting telephone sets to China in 1904. In 1905, Iwadare visited Western Electric in the U.S. to see its management and production control. On his return to Japan, he discontinued the "oyakata" system of sub-contracting and replaced it with a new system where managers and employees were all direct employees of the company. Inefficiency was also removed from the production process. The company paid higher salaries with incentives for efficiency. New accounting and cost controls were put in place, and time clocks were installed.

Between 1899 and 1907 the number of telephone subscribers in Japan rose from 35,000 to 95,000. NEC entered the China market in 1908 with the implementation of the telegraph treaty between Japan and China. They also entered the Korean market, setting up an office in Seoul in January 1908. During the period from 1907 to 1912 sales rose from 1.6 million yen to 2 million yen. The expansion of the Japanese phone service had been a key part of NEC's success during this period.

The Ministry of Communications delayed a third expansion plan of the phone service in March 1913, despite having 120,000 potential telephone subscribers waiting for phone installations. NEC sales fell sixty percent between 1912 and 1915. During the interim, Iwadare started importing appliances, including electric fans, kitchen appliances, washing machines, and vacuum cleaners. Electric fans had never been seen in Japan before. The imports were intended to prop up company sales. In 1916, the government resumed the delayed telephone-expansion plan, adding 75,000 subscribers and 326,000 kilometers of new toll lines. Thanks to this third expansion plan, NEC expanded at a time when much of the rest of the Japanese industry contracted.

=== 1919–1938 ===
In 1919, NEC started its first association with Sumitomo, engaging Sumitomo Densen Seizosho to manufacture cables. As part of the venture, NEC provided cable manufacturing equipment to Sumitomo Densen. Rights to Western Electric's duplex cable patents were also transferred to Sumitomo Densen.

The Great Kantō earthquake struck Japan in 1923. 140,000 people were killed and 3.4 million were left homeless. Four of NEC's factories were destroyed, killing 105 of NEC's engineers and workers. Thirteen of Tokyo's telephone offices were destroyed by fire. Telephone and telegraph service was interrupted by damage to telephone cables. In response, the Ministry of Communications accelerated major programs to install automatic telephone switching systems and enter radio broadcasting. The first automatic switching systems were the Strowger-type model made by Automatic Telephone Manufacturing Co. (ATM) in the United Kingdom. NEC participated in the installation of the automatic switching systems, ultimately becoming the general sales agent for ATM. NEC developed its own Strowger-type automatic switching system in 1924, the first in Japan. One of the plants almost leveled during the Kanto earthquake, the Mita Plant, was chosen to support expanding production. A new three-story steel-reinforced concrete building was built, starting in 1925. It was modeled after the Western Electric Hawthorne Works.

NEC started its radio communications business in 1924. Japan's first radio broadcaster, Radio Tokyo was founded in 1924 and started broadcasting in 1925. NEC imported the broadcasting equipment from Western Electric. The expansion of radio broadcasting into Osaka and Nagoya marked the emergence of radio as an Industry. NEC established a radio research unit in 1924. NEC started developing electron tubes in 1925. By 1930, it was manufacturing its first 500 W radio transmitter. They provided the Chinese Xinjing station with a 100 kW radio broadcasting system in 1934.

Photo-telegraphic equipment developed by NEC transmitted photos of the accession ceremony of Emperor Hirohito. The ceremony was held in Kyoto in 1928. The Newspapers Asahi Shimbun and Mainichi Shimbun were competing to cover the ceremony. The Asahi Shimbun was using a Siemens device. The Mainichi was planning to use French photo-telegraphic equipment. In the end, both papers acquired and used the NEC product, due to its faster transmission rate and higher picture quality.

In 1929, Nippon Electric provided Japan's Ministry of Communications with the A-type switching system, the first of these systems to be developed in Japan. Nippon supplied Japan's Ministry of Communications with nonloaded line carrier equipment for long-distance telephone channels in 1937.

=== 1938–1945 ===
World War II was described by the company as being the blackest days of its history. In 1938 the Mita and Tamagawa plants were placed under military control, with direct supervision by military officers. In 1939, Nippon Electric established a research laboratory in the Tamagawa plant. It became the first Japanese company to successfully test microwave multiplex communications. On 22 December 1941, the enemy property control law was passed. NEC shares owned by International Standard Electric Corporation (ISE), an ITT subsidiary, and Western Electric affiliate were seized. Capital and technical relations were abruptly severed. The "Munitions Company Law" was passed in October 1943, placing overall control of NEC plants under military jurisdiction. The Ueno plant was leveled by the military attack in March 1945. Fire bombings in April and May heavily damaged the Tamagawa Plant, reducing its capacity by forty percent. The Okayama Plant was totally destroyed by a bombing attack in June of the same year. At the end of the war, NEC's production had been substantially reduced by damage to its facilities, and by material and personnel shortages.

=== 1945–1980 ===
After the war, production was slowly returned to civilian use. NEC re-opened its major plants by the end of January 1946. NEC began transistor research and development in 1950. It started exporting radio-broadcast equipment to Korea under the first major postwar contract in 1951. NEC received the Deming Prize for excellence in quality control in 1952. Computer research and development began in 1954. NEC produced the first crossbar switching system in Japan. It was installed at Nippon Telegraph and Telephone Public Corporation (currently Nippon Telegraph and Telephone Corporation; NTT) in 1956. NEC began joint research and development with NTT of electronic switching systems the same year. NEC established Taiwan Telecommunication Company as its first postwar overseas joint venture in 1958. They completed the NEAC-1101 and NEAC-1102 computers in the same year. In September 1958, NEC built its first fully transistorized computer, the NEAC-2201, with parts made solely in Japan. One year later, it demonstrated it at the UNESCO AUTOMATH show in Paris. The company began integrated circuit research and development in 1960. In 1963 NEC started trading as American Depositary Receipts, with ten million shares being sold in the United States. Nippon Electric New York (now NEC America Inc.) was incorporated in the same year.

The NEC logo used from 1963 to 1992

NEC supplied KDD with submarine cable systems for laying in the Pacific Ocean in 1964. They supplied short-haul 24 channel PCM carrier transmission equipment to NTT in 1965. NEC de Mexico, S. A. de C. V., NEC do Brasil, S. A., NEC Australia Pty. Ltd. were established between 1968 and 1969. NEC supplied Comsat Corporation with the SPADE satellite communications system in 1971. In 1972, Switzerland ordered a NEC satellite communications earth station. The same year, a small transportable satellite communications earth station was set up in China. Shares of NEC common stock were listed on the Amsterdam Stock Exchange in 1973. NEC also designed an automated broadcasting system for the Japan Broadcasting Corporation in the same year. NEC Electronics (Europe) GmbH was also established. In 1974, the ACOS series computer was introduced. The New Central Research Laboratories were completed in 1975. In 1977, Japan's National Space Development Agency launched the NEC geostationary meteorological satellite, named Himawari.

During this period NEC introduced the concept of "C&C", the integration of computers and communications. NEC America Inc. opened a plant in Dallas, Texas to manufacture PABX and telephone systems in 1978. They also acquired Electronic Arrays, Inc. of California the same year to start semiconductor chip production in the United States.

=== 1980–2000 ===
In 1980, NEC created the first digital signal processor, the NEC μPD7720. NEC Semiconductors (UK) Ltd. was established in 1981, producing VLSIs and LSIs. In 1983 NEC stock was listed on the Basel, Geneva, and Zurich, Switzerland exchanges. NEC changed its English company name to NEC Corporation in 1983.

In 1986, NEC delivered its SX-2 supercomputer to the Houston Advanced Research Center, The Woodlands, Texas. In the same year, the NEAX61 digital switching system went into service. In 1987, NEC Technologies (UK) Ltd. was established in the United Kingdom to manufacture VCRs, printers, and computer monitors and mobile telephones for Europe.

NEC USA, Inc. was established in 1989 as a holding company for North American operations.

In 1990, the new head office building, known as the "Super Tower", was completed in Shiba, Tokyo. Additionally, joint-venture agreements were established to manufacture and market digital electronic switching systems and LSIs in China.

In 1993 NEC's asynchronous transfer mode (ATM) switching system, the NEAX61 (Nippon Electronic Automatic Exchange) ATM Service Node, went into service in the United States. NEC Europe, Ltd. was established as a holding company for European operations the same year. The NEC C&C Research Laboratories, NEC Europe, Ltd. were opened in Germany in 1994. NEC (China) Co, Ltd. was established as a holding company for Chinese operations in 1996. In 1997 NEC developed 4Gbit DRAM, and its semiconductor group was honored with one of the first Japan Quality Awards. In 1998, NEC opened the world's most advanced semiconductor R&D facility.

=== Personal computers ===
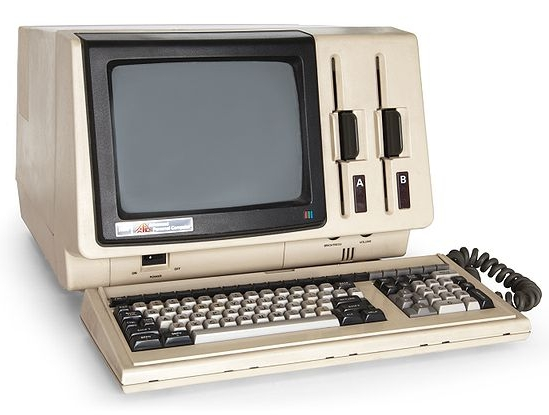
A 1982 NEC APC microcomputer

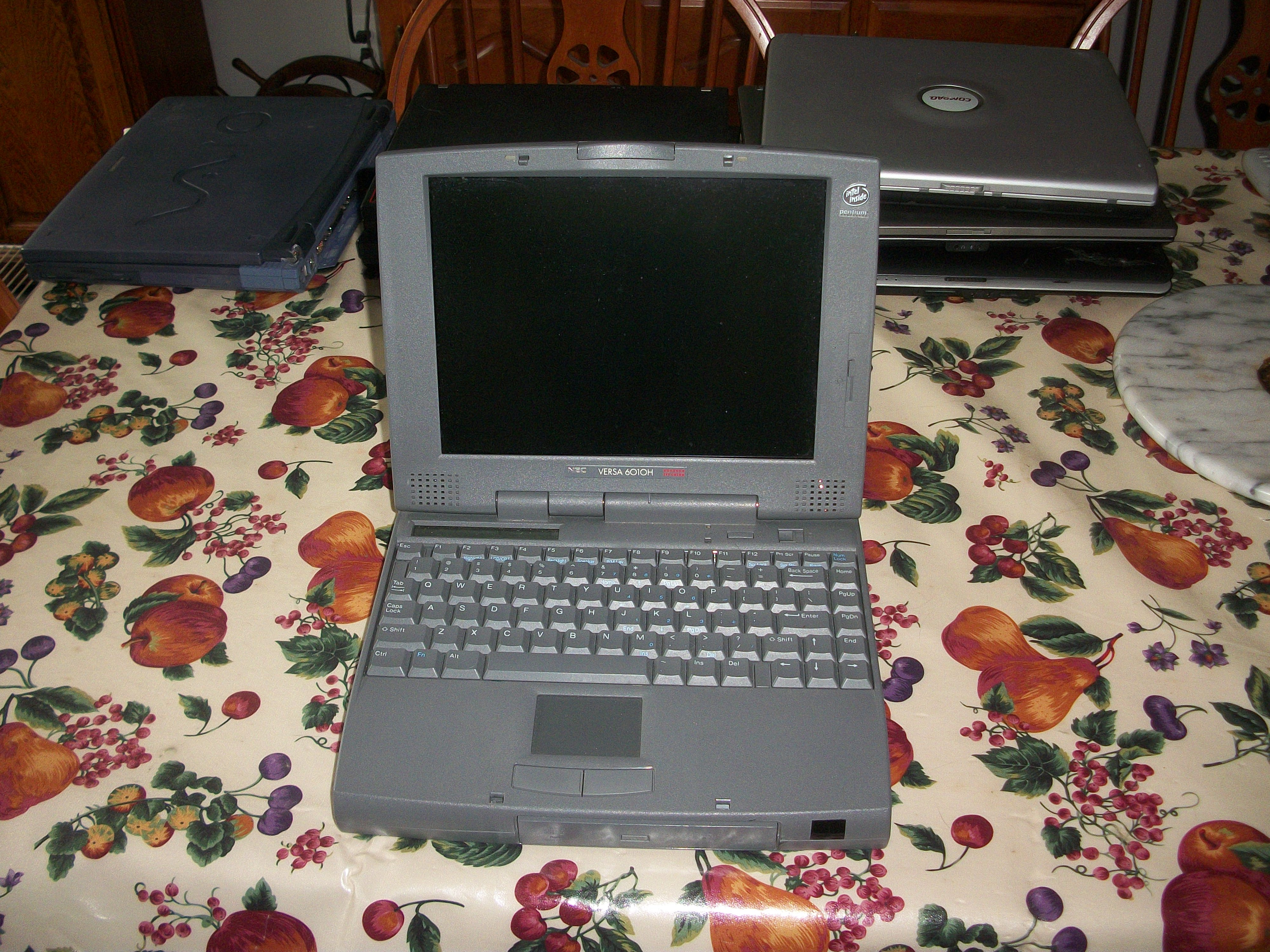
A NEC Versa 6010H from c. 1996

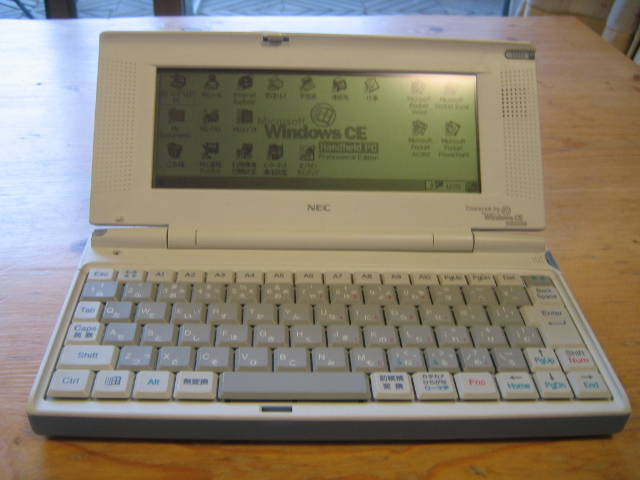
NEC Mobile Gear II MC/R330 handheld computer running Windows CE 2.0 (Japanese market, 1998)

NEC introduced the 8-bit PC-8800 series personal computer in 1981, followed by the 16-bit PC-9800 series in 1982. NEC quickly became the dominant leader of the Japanese PC industry, holding 80% market share.

NEC Information Systems, Inc. started manufacturing computers and related products in the United States in 1984. NEC also released the V-series processor the same year.

Amid increasing competition from Fujitsu, Seiko Epson and IBM Japan, NEC remained the largest Japanese computer manufacturer in the early 1990s, with well over 50% market share. Competition heated up later as rival Fujitsu started to aggressively market its computers, which were industry standard (x86) instead of NEC's indigenous models.

In June 1994, NEC purchased Packard Bell to produce desktop PCs in a common manufacturing plant for the North American market. As a result, NEC Technologies (USA) was merged with Packard Bell to create Packard Bell NEC Inc.

By 1997, NEC's share of the Japanese PC market was reduced to about 35%.

=== Brazil business ===
In 1983, NEC Brasil (pt), the Brazilian subsidiary of NEC, was forced to nationalize its corporate stock under orders of the Brazilian military government, whereby shareholder control of NEC Brasil was ceded to the private equity group Brasilinvest of Brazilian investment banker Mário Garnero. Since NEC Brasil's foundation in 1968, it had become the major supplier of telecommunications equipment to the Brazilian government. In 1986, the then Minister of Communications Antônio Carlos Magalhães put NEC Brasil in financial difficulties by suspending all government contract payments to the company, whose main client was the federal government. With the subsidiary in crisis, the NEC Corporation in Japan sold NEC Brasil to Organizações Globo for only one million US dollars (US$1,000,000). Shortly thereafter, Magalhães resumed the government contracts and corresponding payments, and NEC Brazil became valued at over 350 million US dollars (US$350,000,000). Suspicions regarding the NEC-Globo deal, which included among other things the unilateral breach of contract by Globo founder Roberto Marinho regarding the management of a regional television station in the Brazilian state of Bahia, took to the national stage only in 1992 during the first corruption charges against the impeached Brazilian president Fernando Collor de Mello. Organizações Globo subsequently sold their shares in NEC Brazil, which hit their all-time high during the state monopoly years, back to NEC Corporation in 1999 following the break-up and privatization of the Brazilian state-owned telephone monopoly Telebrás.

=== Video games ===
In 1987, NEC licensed technology from Hudson Soft to create a video game console called the PC Engine (later released in 1989 as the TurboGrafx-16 in the North American market). Its prototype 3D spec successor, the Tetsujin was originally set to be released in 1992, but the lack of completed games pushed the launch date about early 1993, which was planned debut in Japan. While the PC Engine achieved a considerable following, it has been said that NEC held a much stronger influence on the video game industry through its role as a leading semiconductor manufacturer than through any of its direct video game products.

The division of NEC USA, NEC Home Electronics (aka NEC Technologies, Inc.) was established in 1989, which handled the North American release of TurboGrafx-16, until 1992, when its assets were transferred to a joint venture between NEC and Hudson Soft, called Turbo Technologies.

NEC also supplied rival Nintendo with the RISC-based CPU, V810 (same one used in the PC-FX) for the Virtual Boy and VR4300 CPU for the Nintendo 64, released in 1995–1996, and both SNK updated VR4300 CPU (64-bit MIPS III) on Hyper Neo Geo 64, as well as to former rival Sega with a version of its PowerVR 2 GPU for the Dreamcast, released in 1997–1998. After working the previous chipset on the system. NEC supplied Bandai's WonderSwan handheld console, which was originally developed by Gunpei Yokoi, with the V30 MZ CPU.

NEC's final attempt at its own video game console was the Japan-only PC-FX, a 32-bit system with a tower-like design, which was discontinued in 1998. In the 2000s, NEC manufactured dynamic RAM process chips and produced for the GameCube GPU, Flipper, a graphics card development by ArtX.

=== 2000–present ===
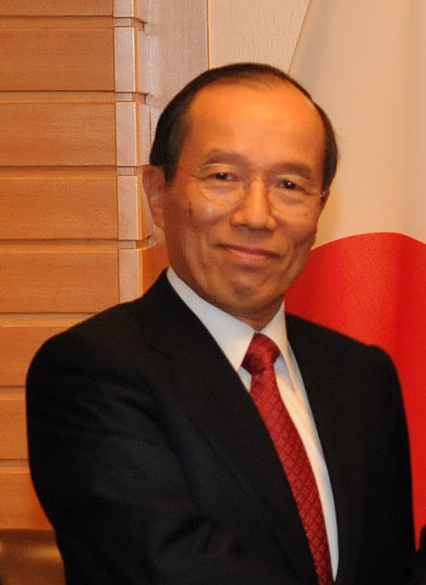
Kaoru Yano, the previous chairman of NEC

NEC Laboratories America, Inc. (NEC Labs) started in November 2002 as a merger of NEC Research Institute (NECI) and NEC USA's Computer and Communications Research Laboratory (CCRL).

NEC built the Earth Simulator Computer (ESC), the fastest supercomputer in the world from 2002 to 2004.

In 2003 NEC had a 20.8% market share in the personal computer market in Japan, slightly ahead of Fujitsu. By Q3 2010, NEC held a 19.8% market share in the PC market in Japan. In 2013 NEC was the biggest PC server manufacturer in Japan, with a 23.6% share. In August 2014, NEC Corporation was commissioned to build a super-fast undersea data transmission cable linking the United States and Japan for a consortium of international companies consisting of China Mobile International, China Telecom Global, Global Transit, Google, KDDI and SingTel. The pipeline went online 30 June 2016.

=== Business restructuring ===
In the 1990s, Japanese computer and semiconductor manufacturers began to experience more intense competition from Korean and Taiwanese rivals. NEC suffered a JPY 224.7 billion loss in 1998-99 and embarked on a restructuring, selling stock holdings as well as its NEC Supertower headquarters.

In 2000, NEC formed a joint-venture with Samsung SDI to manufacture OLED displays. In 2004, NEC abandoned not only the OLED business, but the display business as a whole, by selling off its plasma display business and exiting from the joint-venture with Samsung SDI. Samsung bought all of the shares and related patents owned by NEC, incorporating Samsung OLED, which subsequently merged with Samsung Display.

Although NEC achieved record sales of JPY 5.4 trillion in 2000-01, the end of the dot-com bubble put more pressure on the company. In 2001, NEC announced the closure of its DRAM business, as well as the shutdown or merger of multiple domestic facilities and the downsizing of thousands of personnel. NEC, as well as rivals Toshiba and Fujitsu, saw considerable losses in 2001-02, especially in the semiconductor business. NEC reorganized its management structure in 2003 to focus on IT solution services.

In January 2009, NEC cut about 20,000 jobs, mainly in sluggish semiconductor and liquid crystal display related businesses.

NEC Electronics Corporation was separated from NEC in 2002 as a new semiconductor company. On 23 April 2009, Renesas Technology and NEC Electronics struck a basic agreement to merge, and on 1 April 2010, NEC Electronics and Renesas Technology merged forming Renesas Electronics, set to be fourth-largest semiconductor company according to iSuppli published data.

In 2007, NEC and Nissan started evaluating a joint venture to produce lithium ion batteries for hybrid and electric cars. The two companies established Automotive Energy Supply Corporation as a result. In August 2018, Envision Energy struck an agreement with Nissan and NEC to acquire their automotive battery joint venture.

On 27 January 2011, NEC formed a joint venture with Chinese PC maker Lenovo, the fourth largest PC maker in the world, through a new Dutch company called Lenovo NEC Holdings B.V. NEC received US$175 million from Lenovo through the issuance of Lenovo's shares; Lenovo was to own a 51% stake in the joint venture, while NEC would hold a 49% stake. The joint venture was intended to allow Lenovo to expand in the field of servers, and to allow NEC to grow in China.

On 26 January 2012, NEC Corporation announced that it would cut 10,000 jobs globally due to a big loss on NEC's consolidated financial statement in line with the economic crisis in Europe and lagged in the development of smartphones in the domestic market compared to Apple and Samsung.

In 2013, NEC's management declared a new focus on "social values," re-focusing the company's business on infrastructure such as telecommunications and biometrics systems.

NEC exited from the smartphone market in 2015 by dissolving NEC Mobile Communications, bailing out the other participants in the smartphone joint-venture.

In April 2017, KEMET Corporation announced it would purchase a 61% controlling interest in NEC Tokin from NEC, making NEC Tokin its wholly owned subsidiary. Once the purchase completed, the company changed its name to "Tokin Corporation".

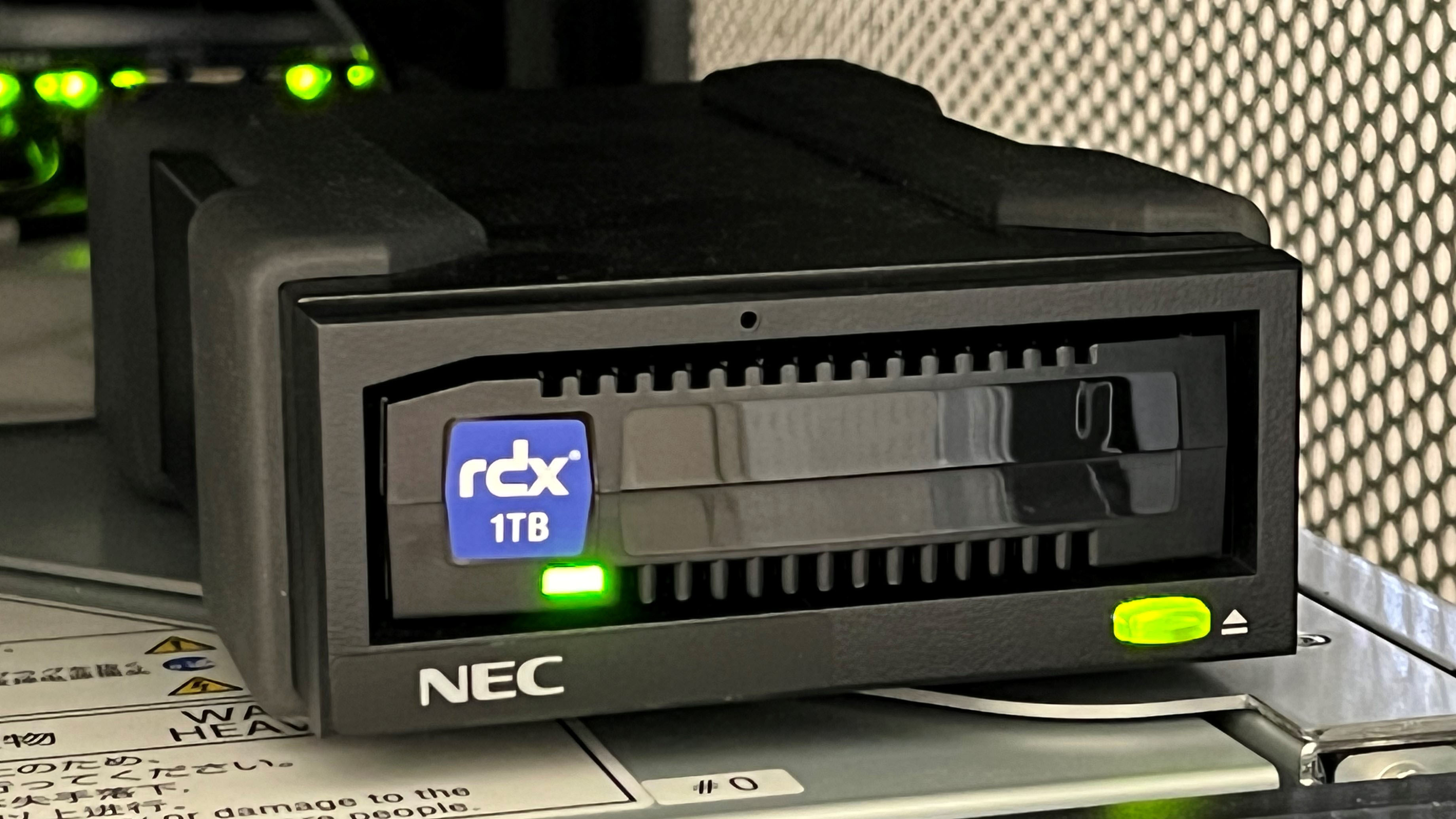
NEC RDX drive with an inserted RDX disk

NEC sold its sixty-year-old lighting business in April 2019. As of September 2019, NEC is the largest supplier of AI surveillance technology in the world.

In the first half of 2020, NEC sold a majority stake in NEC Display Solutions, the professional display subsidiary, to Sharp Corporation and decided to gradually curtail the money-losing energy storage business throughout the decade.

=== 5G business and NTT investment ===
NEC began work on 5G networks with NTT Docomo in 2014, and was a principal technical partner for NTT Docomo's next-generation IOWN network starting in 2019, followed by 6G testing in 2022. Upon the suggested banning of Huawei's 5G equipment led by the United States in 2020, being a diminished supplier, NEC was galvanized to ramp up its relatively small 5G network business to fill the void in the telecommunications equipment markets of the United States and the United Kingdom. NTT invested $596 million for a 4.8 percent stake in NEC to assist this move, creating a relationship colloquially known as the "Den-Den Family." However, as NEC's equipment became uncompetitive with other manufacturers, Docomo shifted to procuring more foreign-sourced base stations in 2024, and NEC announced the downsizing of its base station business in January 2026. NTT announced in November 2026 that it would sell all of its stock in NEC and invest the profit in its own AI business.

=== International acquisitions ===
In July 2018, NEC established its subsidiary, NEC X, in Silicon Valley, to fast-track technologies and business ideas selected from inside and outside NEC. NEC X created a corporate accelerator program that works with entrepreneurs, start-ups and existing companies to help them develop new products that leverage NEC's emerging technologies.

In December 2018, NEC announced that it would acquire KMD, the largest Danish IT company, for $1.2 billion to strengthen its digital government business.

In December 2020, NEC acquired Swiss digital banking solution developer Avaloq for US$2.2 billion.

In October 2025 NEC announced the acquisition of CSG International, an American billing and business support system vendor, for $2.89 billion.

In 2025, NEC created Mobile Fortify, a mobile app used by United States Immigration and Customs Enforcement (ICE) during the second Trump presidency, to identify individuals and their potential immigration status using facial recognition AI.

== Operations ==
As of July 2018, NEC has 6 larger business segments—Public, Enterprise, Network Services, System Platform, Global, and Others. It has renamed its Telecom Carrier business to Network Service.

Principal subsidiaries of NEC include:

- NEC Corporation of America
- Netcracker Technology
- NEC Display Solutions of America (A Sharp-owned company as of July 2020)
- NEC Europe
- KMD
- Avaloq
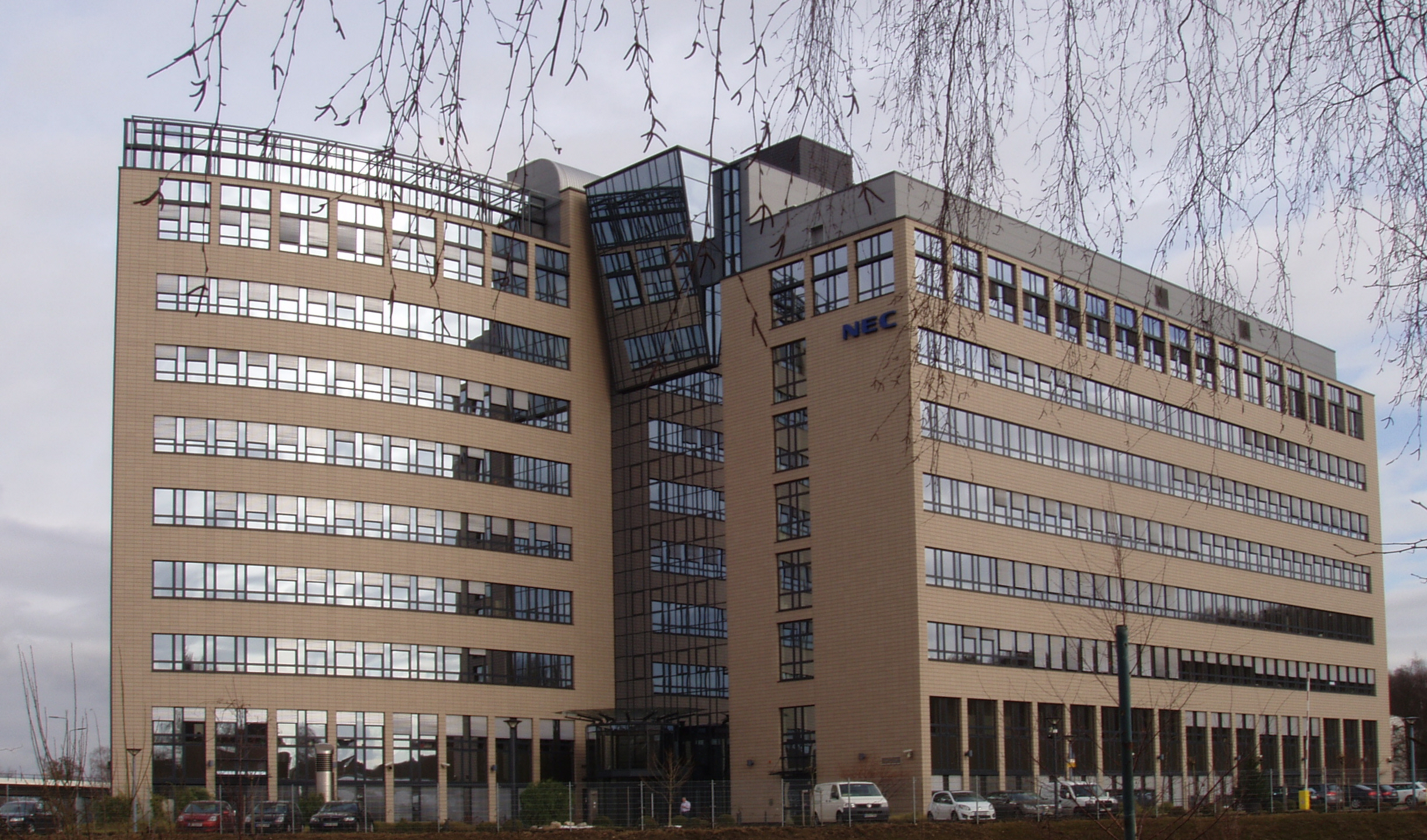
The European headquarters of Renesas Electronics Europe in Düsseldorf, Germany (formerly NEC Electronics (Europe))

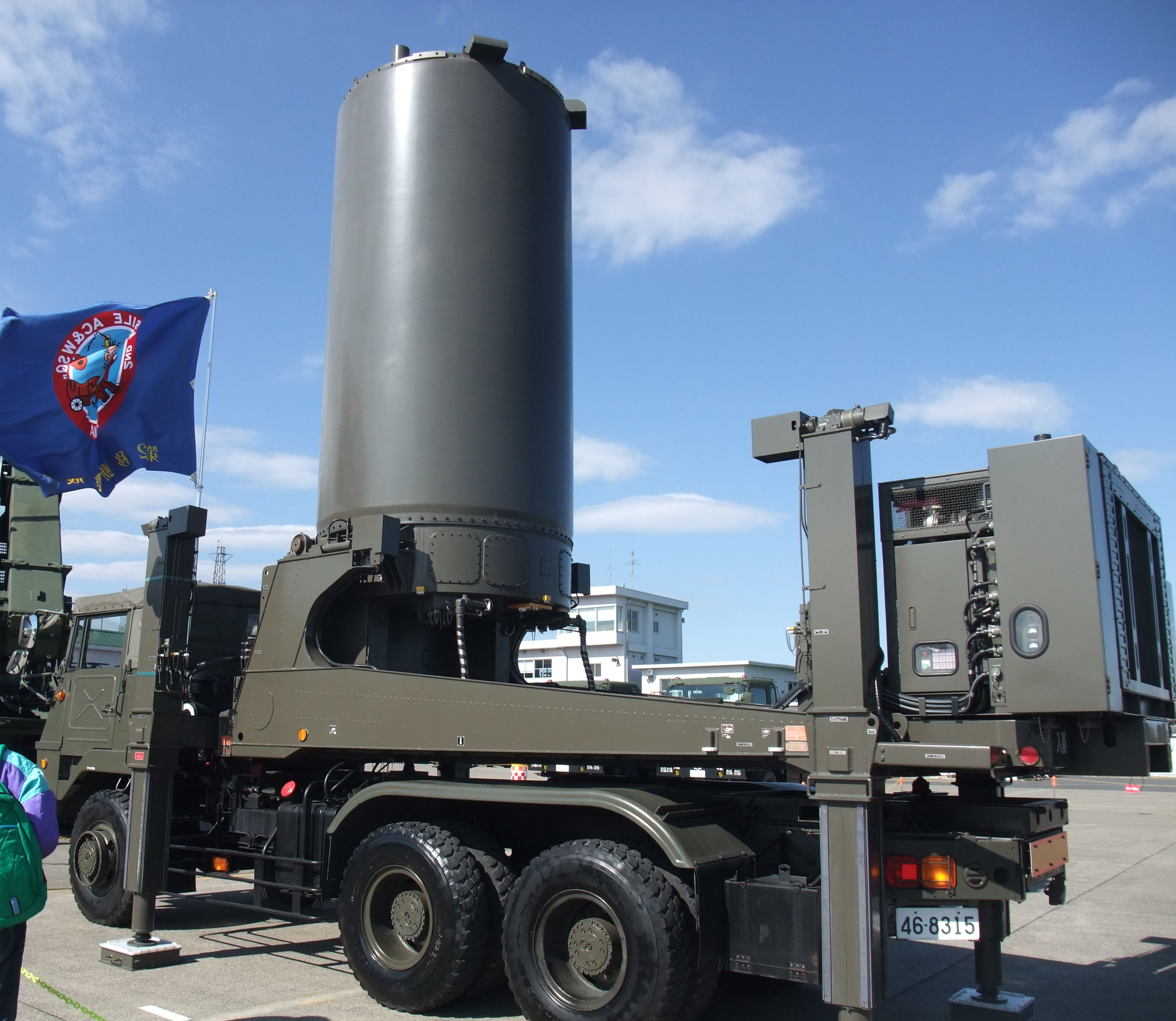
Japan Ground Self-Defense Force J/TPS-102 self-propelled ground-based early warning 3D radar

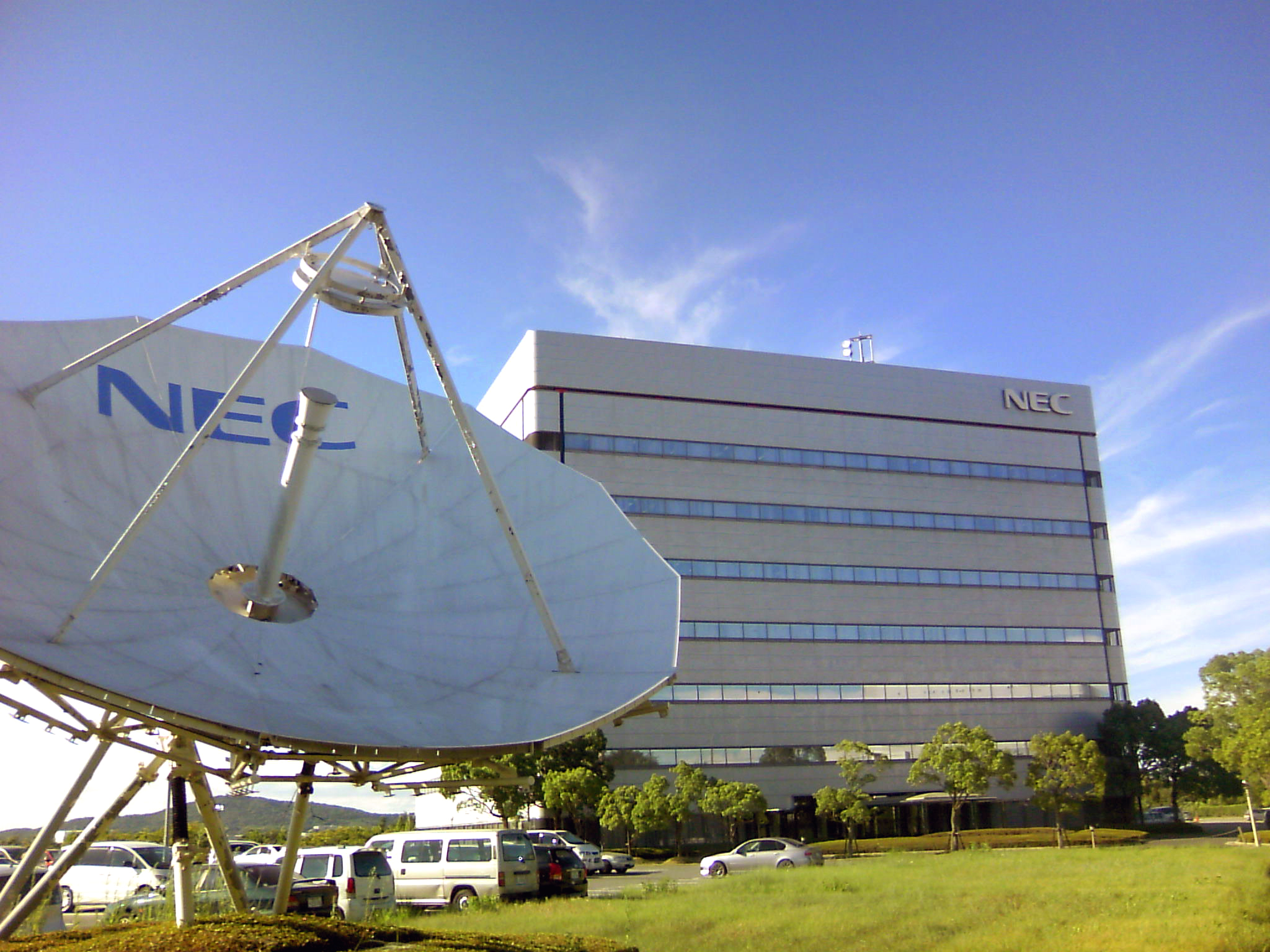
NEC's Kobe system center

== Products ==
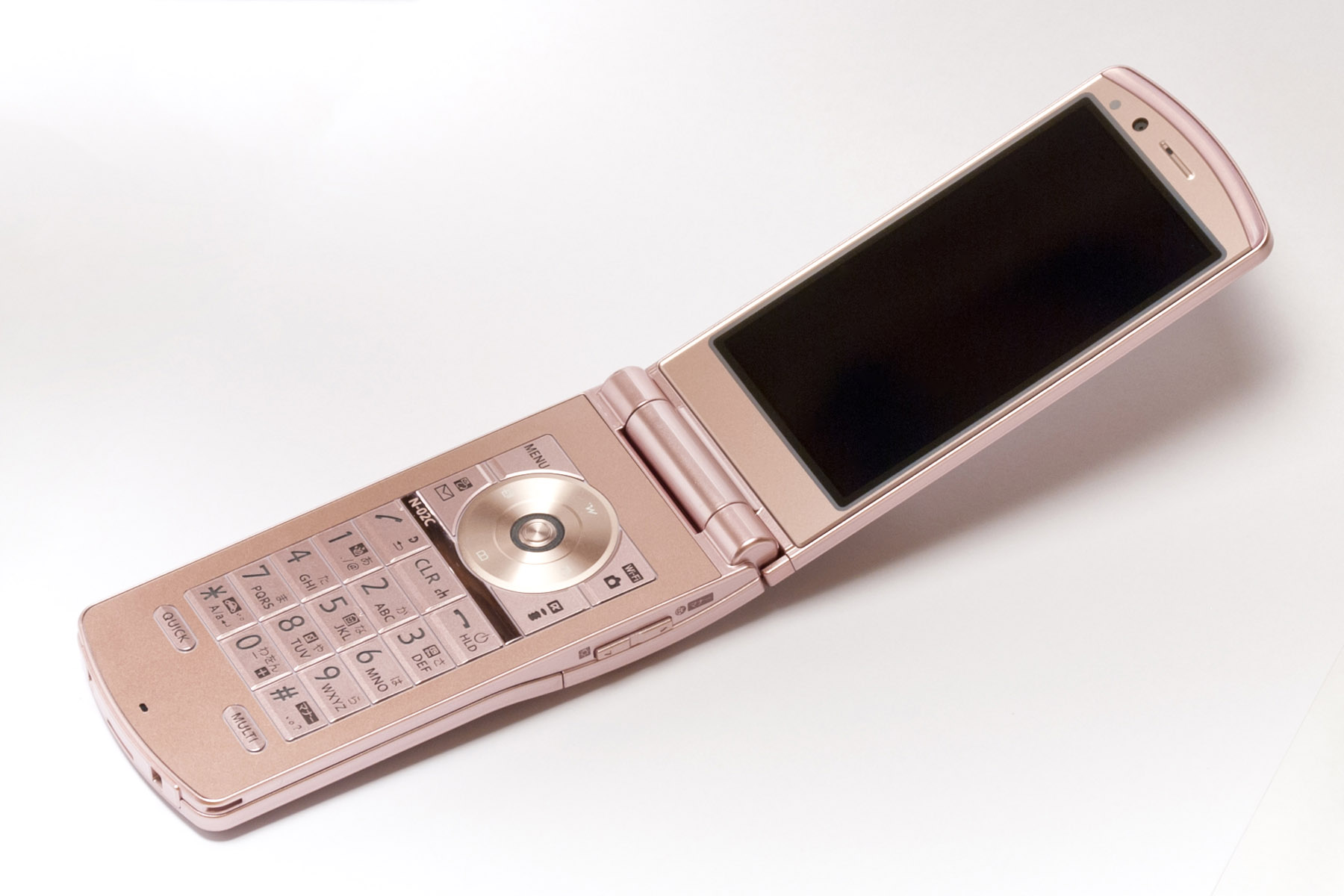
An NTT DoCoMo FOMA N-02C mobile phone produced by NEC

- NEC MobilePro – a handheld computer running Windows CE

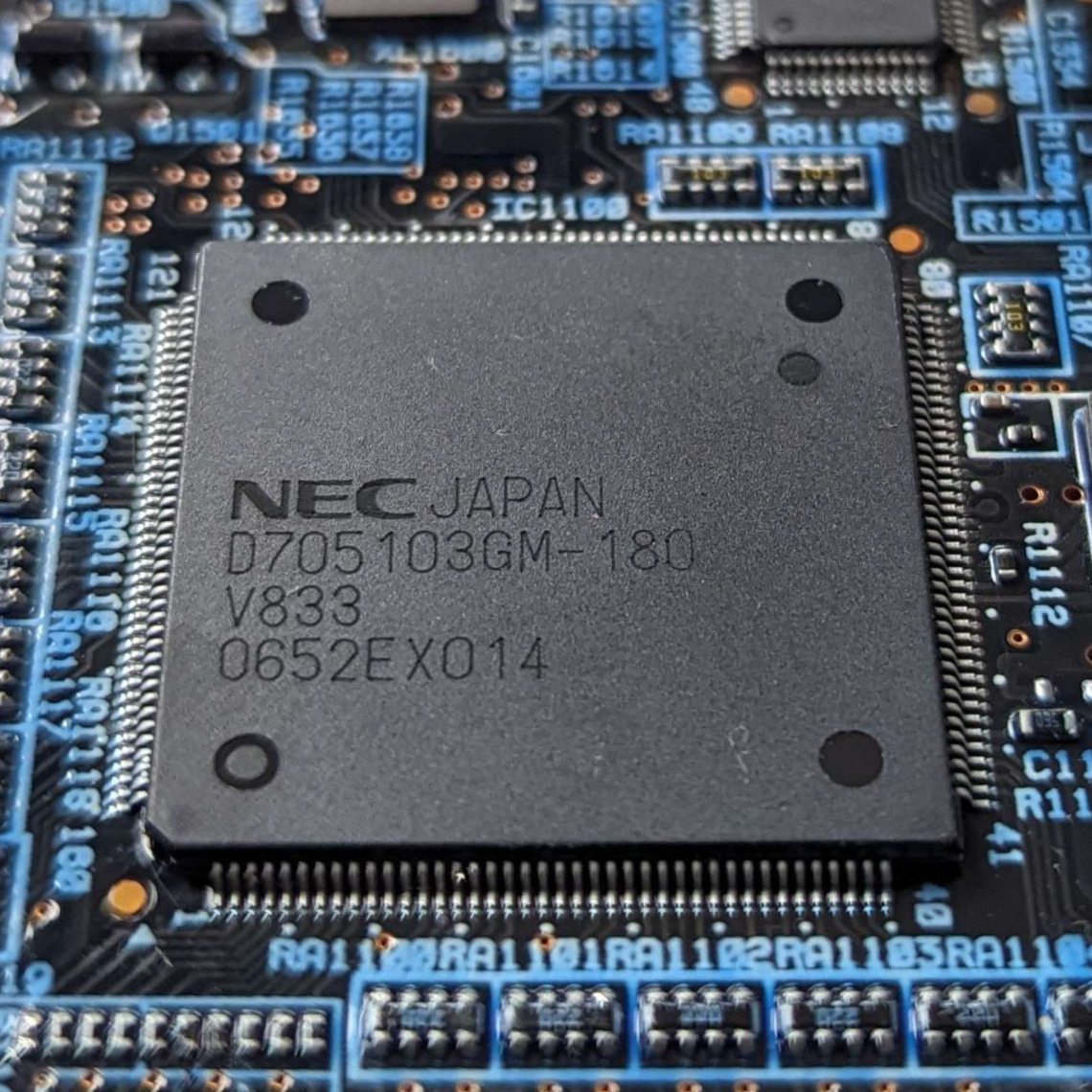
An NEC v833 MCU with a 2006 date code

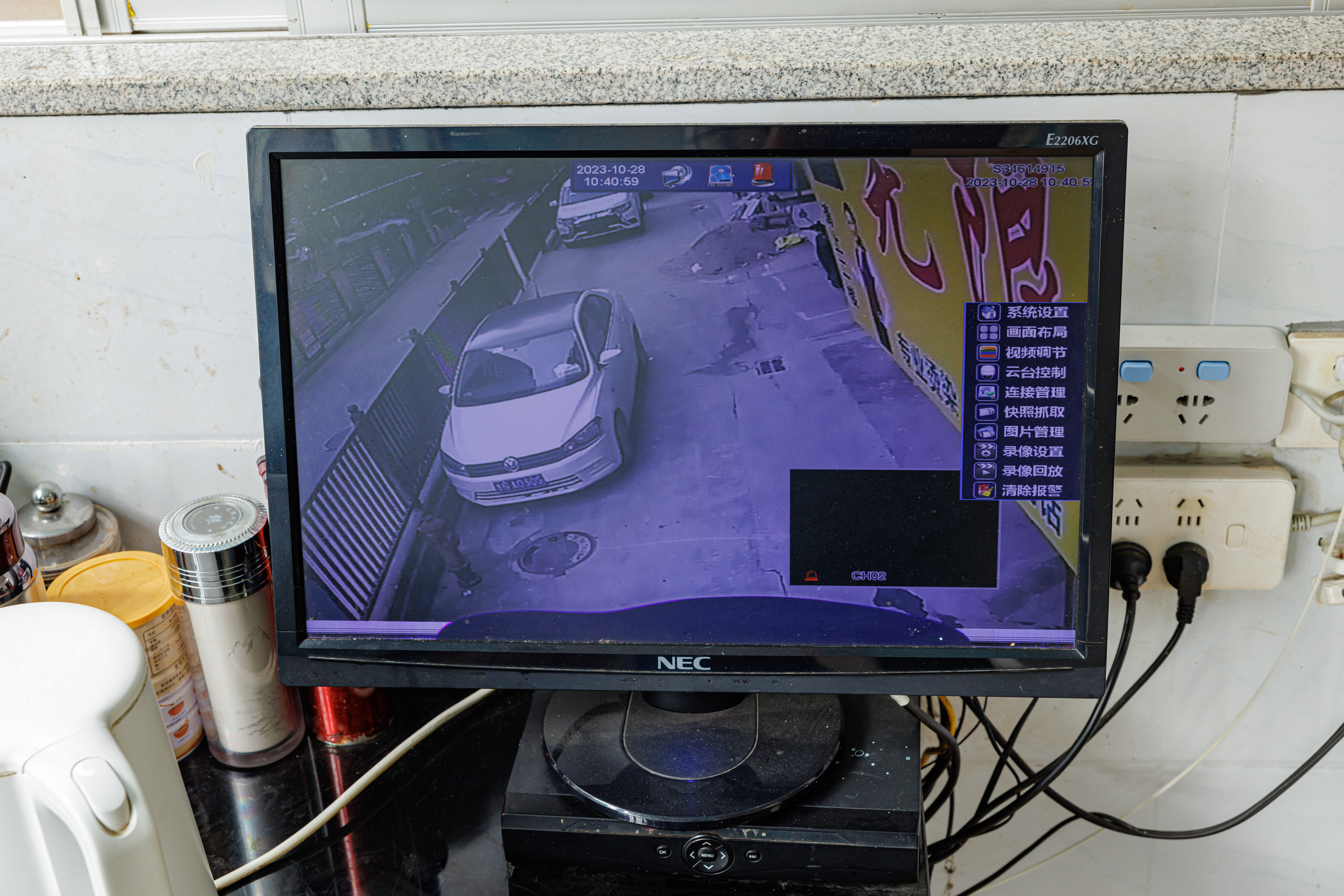
NEC MONITOR E2206XG

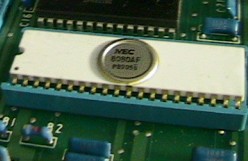
NEC 8080AF cropped

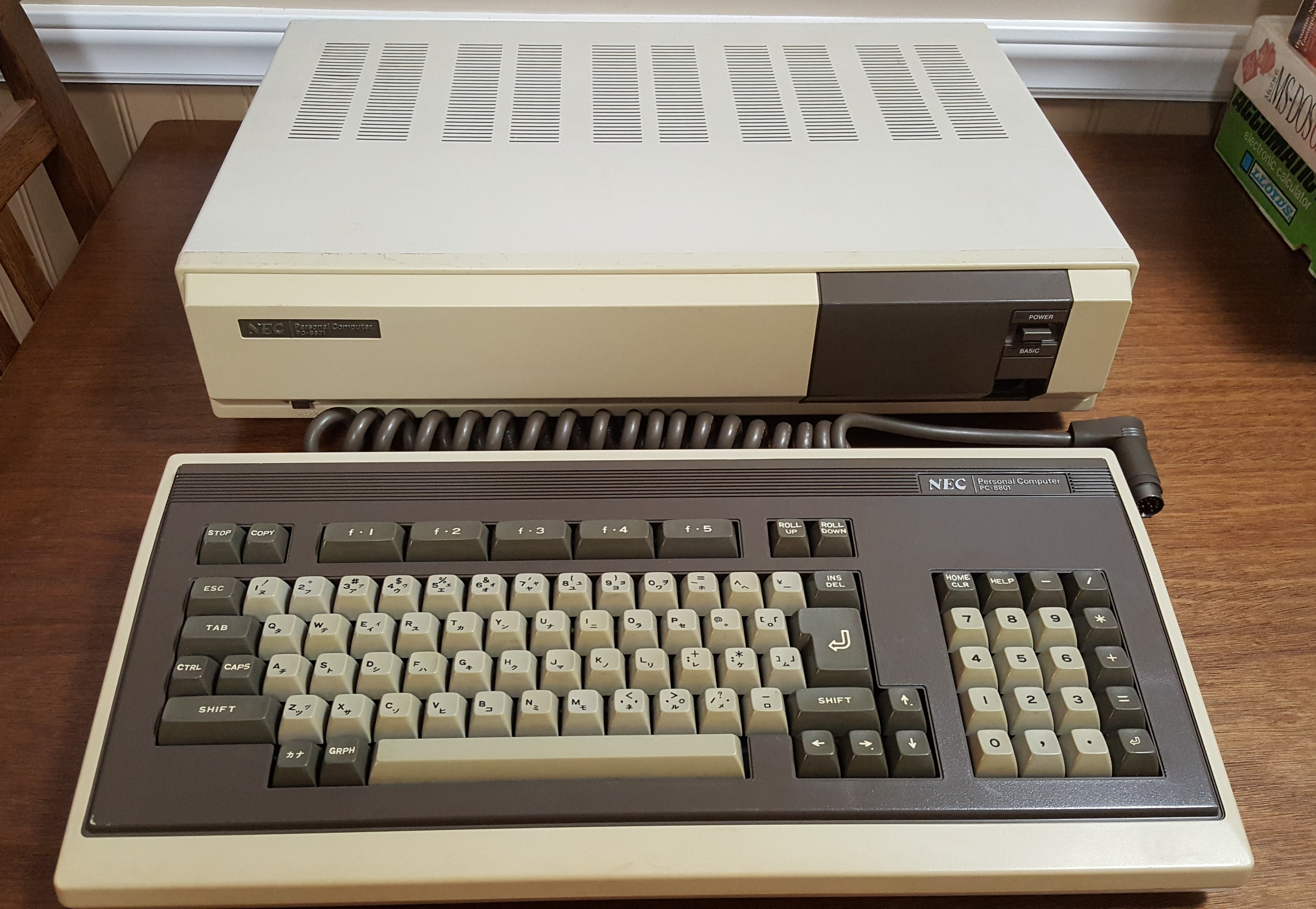
NEC PC-8801 with keyboard

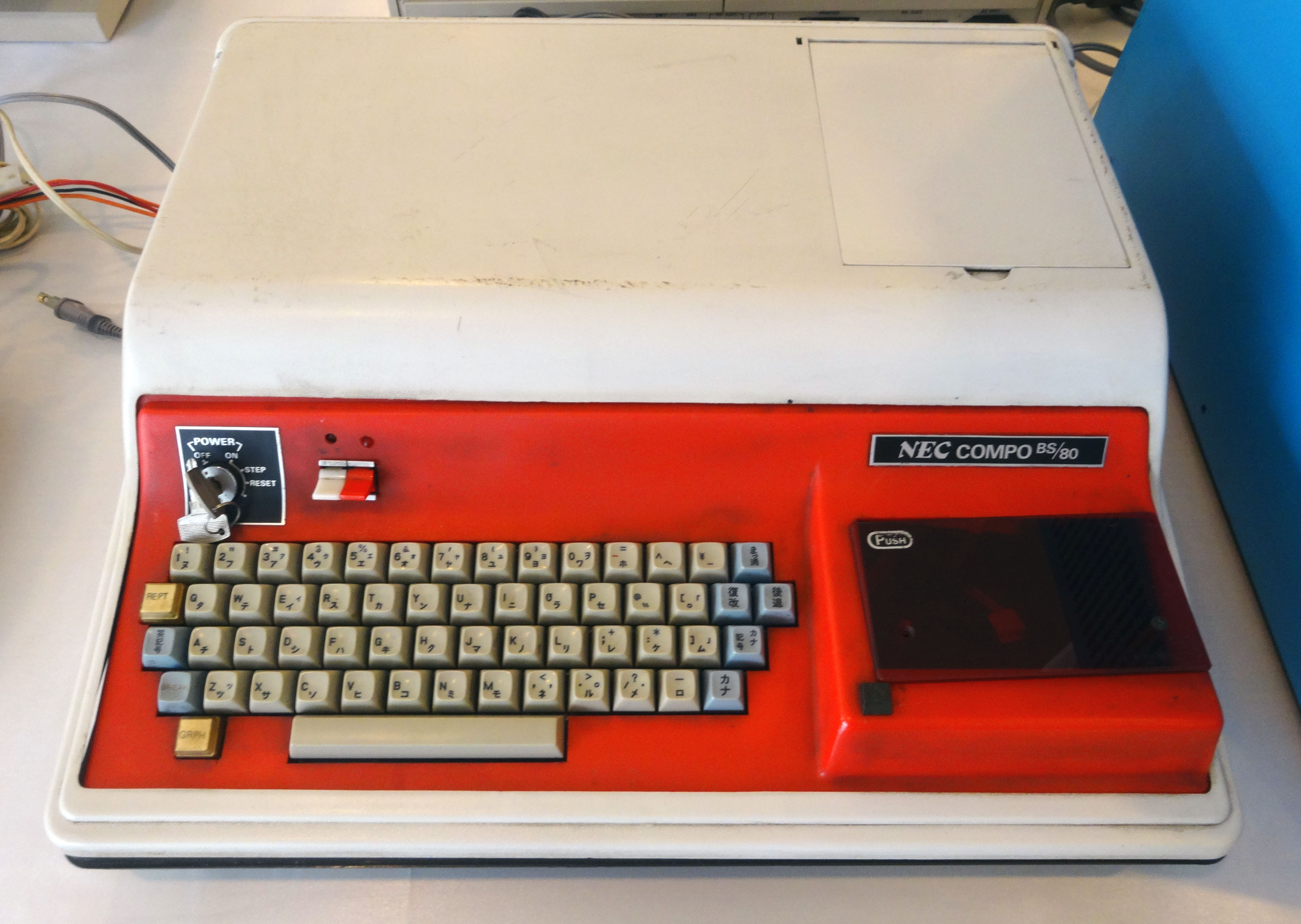
NEC Personal Computer COMPO BS/80

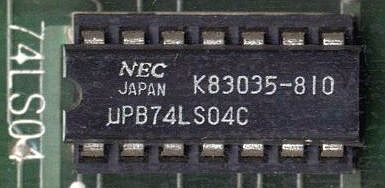
NEC uPB74LS04C

- NEC Aspire hybrid small business phone system
- Electric vehicle batteries (Automotive Energy Supply Corporation, a joint-venture between Nissan, NEC Corporation and NEC TOKIN)
- NEC mobile phone (see NEC e616)
- NEC America MultiSync Monitors and Fax devices1
- NEC digital cinema projector
- NEC Home Electronics (USA), Inc. / NEC MultiSpeed laptop PCs, MultiSync series PC monitors and Data Projectors
- NEC Home Electronics (USA), Inc. / TV, Projection TV, VCRs and Home Audio (CD, Amplifiers, Receivers)
- NEC Technologies, Inc. / Versa series notebook PCs
- NEC Information Systems, Inc. POWERMATE desktop PCs
- NEC Information Systems, Inc. Valuestar / NEC POWERMATE hybrid computer
- NEC (Division unknown) Car Stereos and Keyless Entry Systems
- Game consoles:
  - PC Engine (TurboGrafx-16 in the US) and all related hardware and successors; co-produced by Hudson Soft.
    - SuperGrafx, upgrade hardware revision
  - PC Engine GT (TurboExpress in the US)
  - PC Engine Duo (TurboDuo in the US)
  - PC-FX
- Personal computers:
  - PC-6000 series
  - PC-6600 series
  - PC-8000 series
  - PC-8800 series
  - PC-9800 series, also known as PC-98
- Microprocessors:
  - NEC V20
  - NEC V25

Defense products include:

- J/TPS-102 Self-propelled ground-based early warning 3D radar (JASDF)
- Broadband multipurpose radio system (JGSDF)
- Advanced Combat Infantry Equipment System [ACIES] (JSDF) – Major subcontractor
- Howa rifle system (JSDF) – Major subcontractor as part of ACIES

Food

- Ren AI Pan

=== Laptops ===
- ProSpeed
- Versa pro type VB December 2016

=== Telephones and unified communications systems ===
- NEC SL2100
- Univerge Blue (UC Platform)
- Univerge SV9100
- Univerge SV9300
- Univerge SV9500
- InApps

=== Supercomputers ===
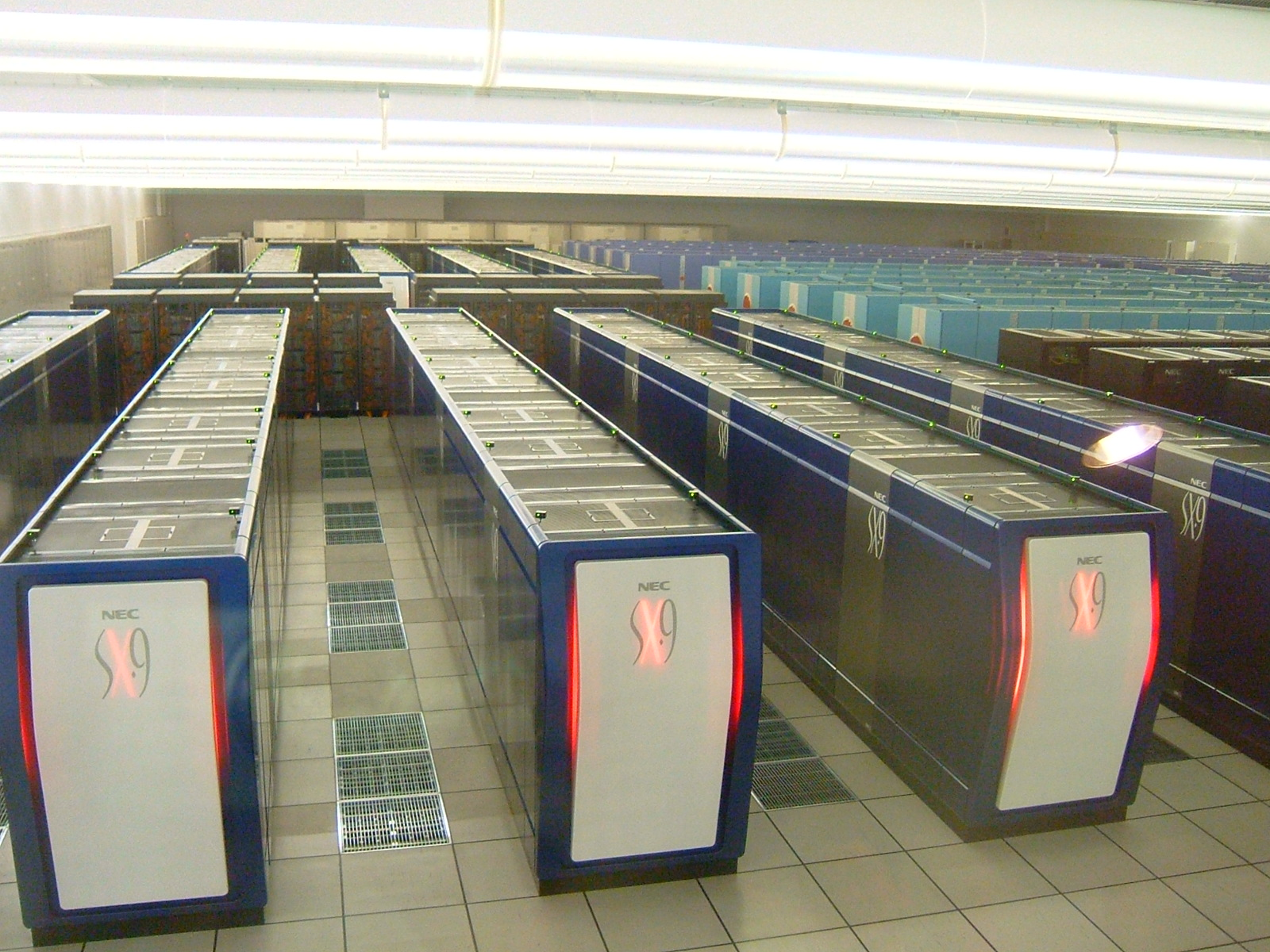
The Earth Simulator

- 1983 Announced the SX-1 and SX-2 supercomputers
- 1989 Introduction of SX-3
- 1994 First announcement of SX-4
- 1999 Delivery of SX-5
- 2002 Introduced SX-6
- 2002 Installation of the Earth Simulator, the world's fastest supercomputer from 2002 to 2004 reaching a speed of 35,600 gigaflops
- 2005 NEC SX-8 in production
- 2006 Announced the SX-8R
- 2007 Announced the SX-9
- 2011 First announcement of the NEC SX-9's successor
- 2013 Announced the SX-ACE
- 2017 Announced the SX-Aurora TSUBASA computing platform that expands the horizons of supercomputing, Artificial Intelligence and Big Data analytics.

== Achievements ==
Achievements of NEC include:

- the discovery of single-walled carbon nanotubes by Sumio Iijima
- the invention of the widely used MUX-scan design for test methodology (contrast with the IBM-developed level-sensitive scan design methodology)
- the world's first demonstration of the one-qubit rotation gate in solid state devices.
- As for mobile phones, NEC pioneered key technologies like color displays, 3G support, dual screens and camera modules.
- Developed a facial recognition system able to detect and distinguish human faces through medical masks.
- Released the first home console video game system to use compact discs, being the first widely available product to use compact discs as a platform for interactive video entertainment outside of home computer use.

== Sports teams ==
=== Owned teams ===
NEC owns the NEC Red Rockets women's volleyball team, which plays in Kawasaki.

NEC also used to own Montedio Yamagata of the football (soccer) J. League, the NEC Blue Rockets men's volleyball team until its dissolution in 2009, and the NEC Green Rockets men's rugby union team until its sale to East Japan Railway Company in 2026.

=== Sponsorships ===
NEC has sponsored numerous international sports teams and events, including:

- Davis Cup (until 2002, when BNP Paribas took over the sponsorship)
- NEC Cup (a Go tournament in Japan)
- NEC Shun-Ei (a Go tournament for young players in Japan)
- Everton FC (from 1985 to 1995; the 1995 FA Cup Final triumph was Everton's final game of the decade-long NEC sponsorship, and Danka took over as sponsors)
- Sauber F1 Team (from 2011 season until 2014 season)
- Sahara Force India F1 Team (from 2015 season until its demise during 2018 season)
- Racing Point (2019 season)
- PGA Tour Latinoamérica (a third-tier men's professional golf tour)
- Washington Wizards (from 2019, capitalizing on the popularity of Japanese player Rui Hachimura)
- Los Angeles Angels (from 2019, aimed at building brand awareness for its biometrics and AI businesses)
- Essendon FC (from 2020)

== See also ==
- List of computer system manufacturers
- TurboGrafx-16 Mini
