= NEC e616 =

Mobile phone model

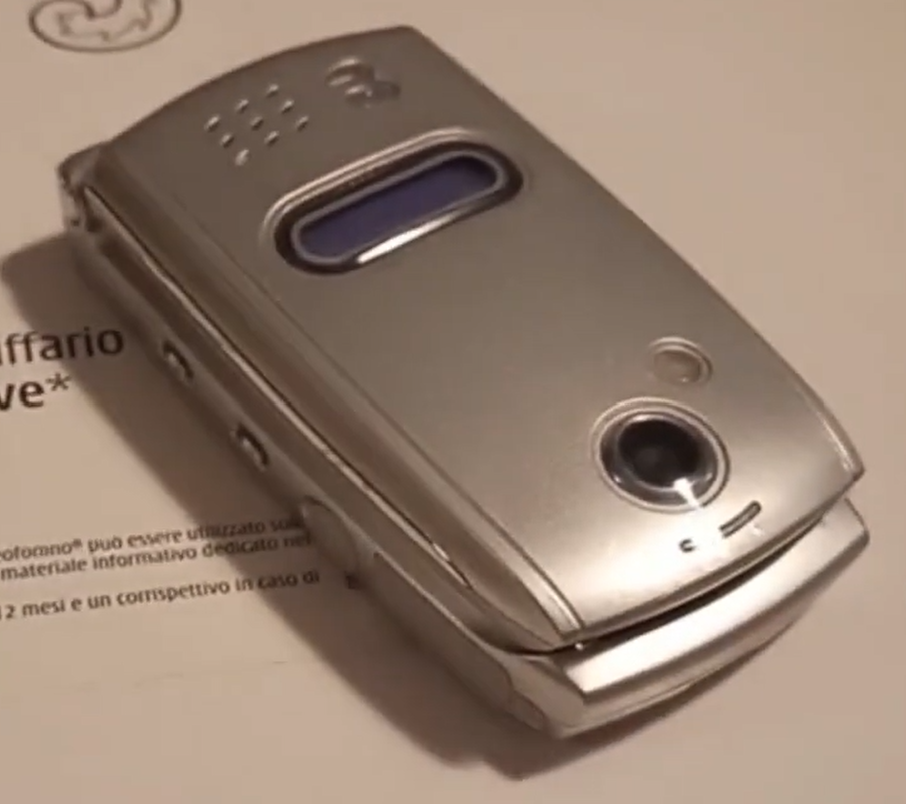
NEC E616v

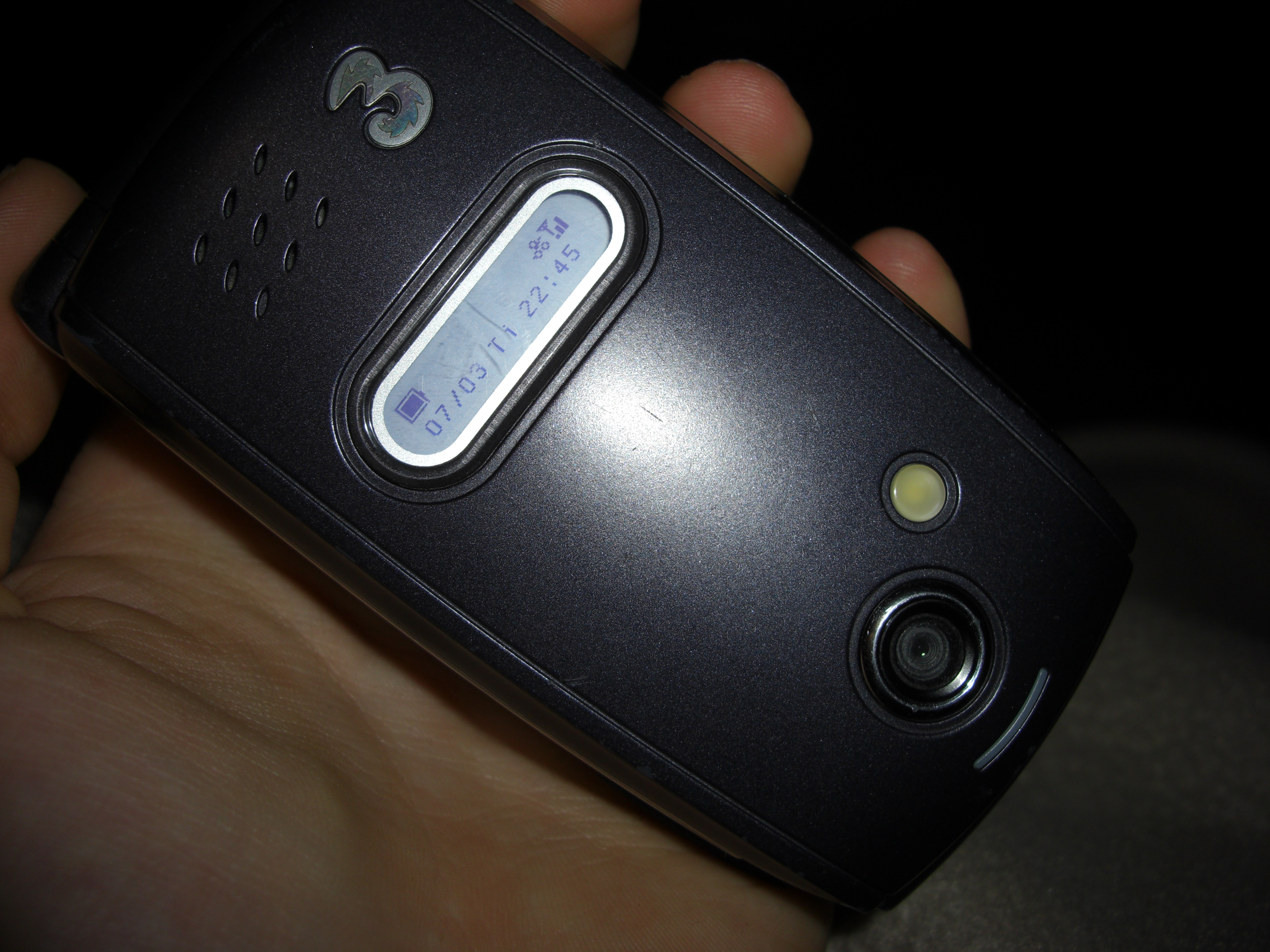
Nec e616V

The NEC e616 is a 3G mobile phone from NEC Corporation announced in October 2003 and released in early 2004.

== Rechargeable battery ==
The e616 takes Lithium ion batteries, which are available in different capacities:

- 780 mA·h standard battery (always included) tested standby time in 3G network : 6–12 h depending on use of the phone
- 1360 mA·h high capacity battery (sometimes included) tested standby time in 3G network : 12–24 h depending on use of the phone

== Usage notes ==
Batteries should always be recharged in the recharger and not within the mobile phone. Recharging in the mobile takes longer and the standby time will be halved. The short standby time and recharging error may be caused by faulty firmware or a faulty 3G network. In addition the battery time can be increased by turning off the GPS and vibra call alert, and by turning down the backlight of the display. Testing has revealed that using the phone in 2G network will provide 3-4 times the standby time than using it in 3G networks.

== Media ==
=== Wallpapers ===
The screen size of the e616 is 176x240 pixels, but the wallpaper should be restricted to 176×200 pixels to allow for the status bar at the top and the menu bar at the bottom of the screen.

=== Ringtones ===
The NEC e616 supports polyphonic ringtones.

== Information Codes ==
Special codes supported by the e616 include:

- *#06# shows IMEI number
- *#2820# shows Software Version
- *#3210# shows SP lock info
- *#4960# shows sim lock info
- *#7320# shows net lock info
- *#8140# shows corporate lock info
- *73738# master reset
- #7320*(8 digits password)# release the Net Lock, password required
- *#2634# unlock APN 1-2 and the GPRS attach.

The codes are entered in the same way as a normal phone number.
