= Avaloq =

Swiss banking software company

Avaloq Group AG
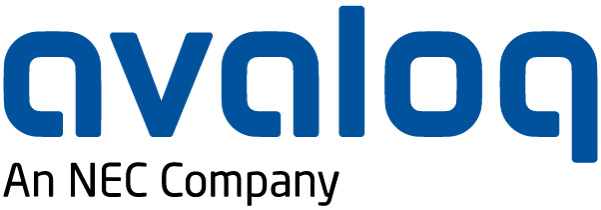
- Type: Subsidiary
- Industry: Core banking, financial services
- Founded: 1985
- Founder: Francisco Fernandez
- Headquarters: Zürich, Switzerland
- Area served: Worldwide
- Key people: Martin Greweldinger (CEO)
- Parent: NEC Corporation
- Website: www.avaloq.com

Avaloq is a Swiss company that develops and provides the Avaloq Banking Suite software for core banking.

== Background ==
Core banking includes information about customers, transactions and account balances. Banks have traditionally bought software for these purposes rather than developing it internally, as they can require very complex computer programs that can be difficult to manage. Coding changes for compliance with new regulations and for accommodating new products can be problematic.

As a result, banks have tended to buy in modern comprehensive software from large, specialist firms. This may be run by the bank itself or by an agency running the computing service on behalf of the bank.

== Company history ==
Avaloq was founded in Zürich in 1985, under the name "BZ Informatik Aktiengesellschaft", functioning as the information technology subsidiary of BZ Bank. The founder is Francisco Fernandez. In 1991, 30% of the share capital was taken by the employees as a result of a partial management buyout. At that time, there were five staff members and the cost of the buyout was $200,000.

The first customer was Swiss National Bank, followed by five other commercial banks in Switzerland. The system then spread worldwide. Initially, the firm was called BZ Informatik, and its product “AdvAntAge”.

In 1996, the current name was adopted. In 2001, the company split from BZ Bank, as the employees acquired 100% of the share capital.

Product development of the software takes place in Zürich and Edinburgh, supported by a support center in Manila. New capacity was built primarily at the international sites, most notably in Edinburgh.

In 2013, the group expanded its presence in Germany by entering into a cooperation with quirin Bank, acquiring Höll Computer & Software GmbH and establishing Avaloq Sourcing (Deutschland) AG, based in Berlin.

In 2015, Avaloq went live with its two BPO centers in Germany and Singapore.

In November 2019, Reuters reported that Warburg Pincus was working with Goldman Sachs and Barclays on a planned IPO or sale of Avaloq.

In October 2020, Avaloq was acquired by NEC Corporation for $2.2bn.

== Current activities ==
Avaloq Banking Group AG employs 2,500 staff, 500 of which are programmers. It has annual revenues of over $500 million and its software accounts for bank deposits to the sum of $4 trillion.

The Avaloq Banking Suite software is used by over 450 customers including HSBC, Barclays, Royal Bank of Scotland, UBS, Deutsche Bank, Nomura and Societe Generale. Some of the customers have performed business process outsourcing to Avaloq itself for the actual running of the core computing service, which uses cloud computing. Apart from a 10% holding by a Swiss bank, Avaloq is owned by its employees, and it has major offices in Zürich, Edinburgh and Manila. In 2016, the firm was rumoured to be seeking investment from private equity investors. In 2025, Avaloq opened a new office in Dubai.

To proactively guard against cyber attack, Avaloq engages a number of companies based in Israel to attempt to break through the security systems and then help plug the vulnerabilities uncovered.
