= NEC Supertower =

Skyscraper in Tokyo

NEC Super Tower
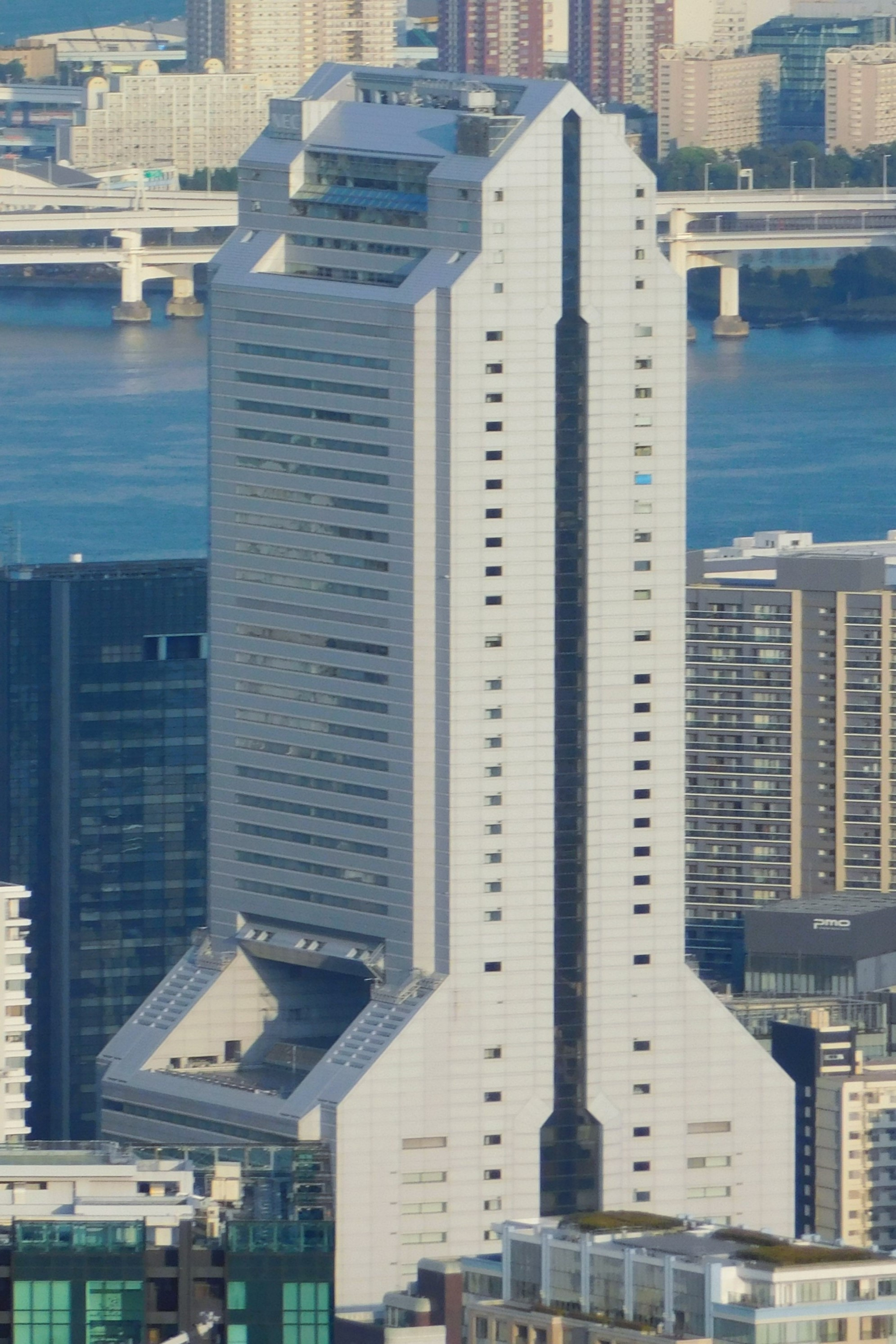

General information
- Location: Minato, Tokyo, Japan
- Coordinates: 35°38′58″N 139°44′53″E
- Construction started: 1986
- Completed: 1990
- Owner: NEC (1990–2000); TOP REIT (2000–2016); Nomura Real Estate Master Fund (2016–)

Height
- Roof: 180 m (590 ft)

Technical details
- Floor count: 43

The NEC Super Tower (NECスーパータワー, NEC Sūpātawā), often known as "NEC Supertower, SuperTower or simply Supertower", headquarters of NEC Corporation, is a 180-metre (590 foot) tall skyscraper in Minato, Tokyo, Japan, with 43 stories above ground and five underground. It has a total floor area of 144,476 m² and sits on 21,190 m² of land, adjacent to Mita Station and Tokyo Metropolitan Route 409. It housed approx. 6,000 employees as of 2020.

== History ==
NEC commissioned the building on the site of its headquarters and main factory to coincide with the company's 90th anniversary. The building was designed by Nikken Sekkei and built by a joint venture of Kajima and Obayashi. Construction began in November 1986 and was completed in January 1990. It was the first building in Tokyo to be subject to the metropolitan environmental impact assessment ordinance, and won a Good Design Award in 1994.

The "Super Tower" nickname was chosen through a company internal contest, and was inspired by the building's "superframe" structure and its resemblance to the nearby Tokyo Tower.

NEC sold the building for JPY 90 billion in January 2000 to raise funds for a corporate restructuring. The building was then securitized, with NEC continuing to occupy the space as a lessee. TOP REIT, Inc. purchased a 50% interest in the building for JPY 41.9 billion in 2006.

NEC began a long-term interior renovation project in 2019.

== Design ==
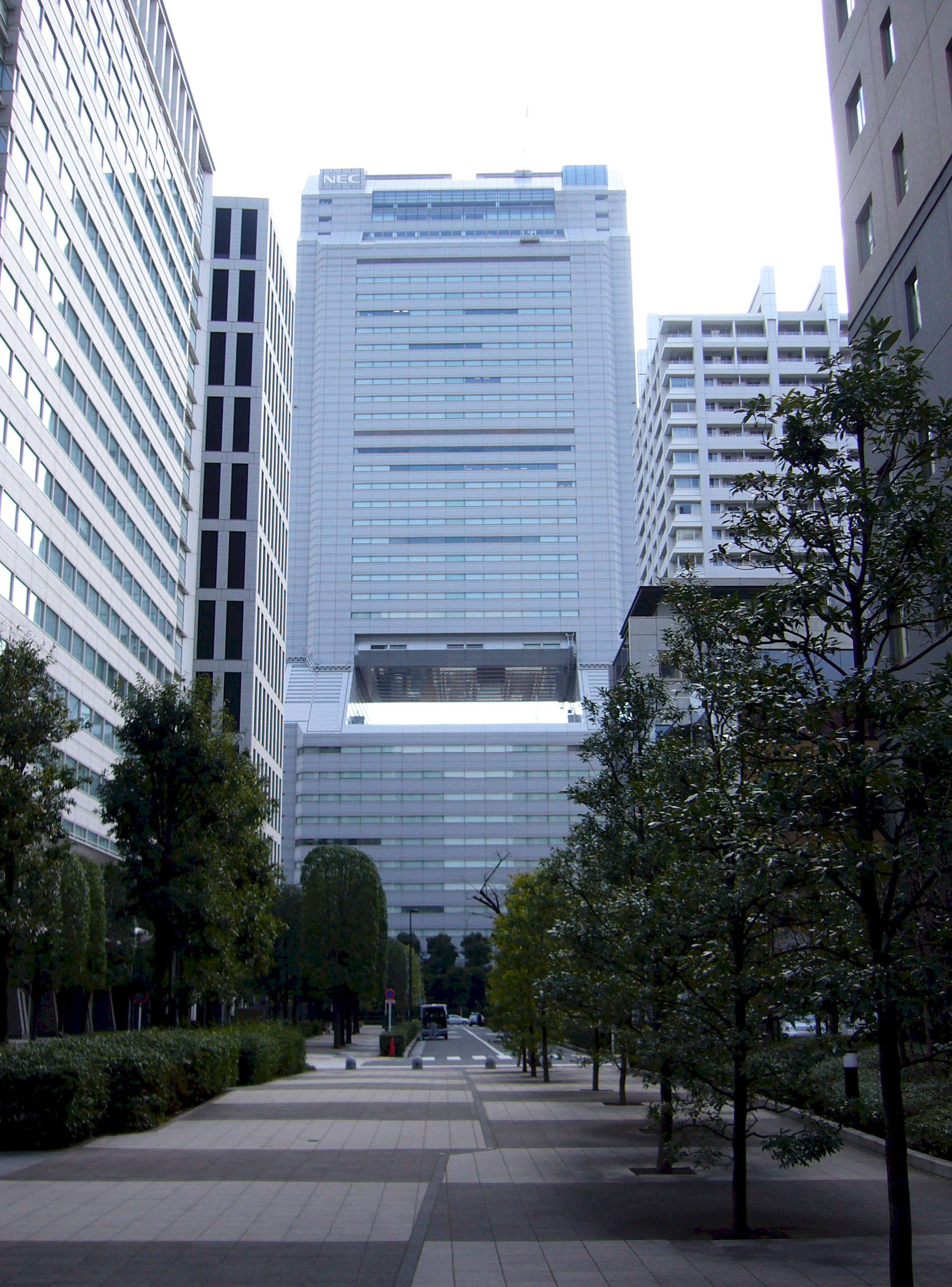
View from the north, showing the "Wind Avenue" running through the building's center.

The building is nicknamed the "Rocket Building" due to its three-stage tapering design, which was intended to minimize wind damage and shadows on the surroundings.

The lowest tier of the building, from the first to twelfth floors, has a U-shaped floor plan formed around an open atrium. A "Wind Avenue" 50 to 65 meters above ground level allows wind and sunlight to pass through the center of the building. The upper tiers have an oblong shape running east-west.
