= Institute of Science Tokyo Hospital =

Institute of Science Tokyo Hospital 東京科学大学病院
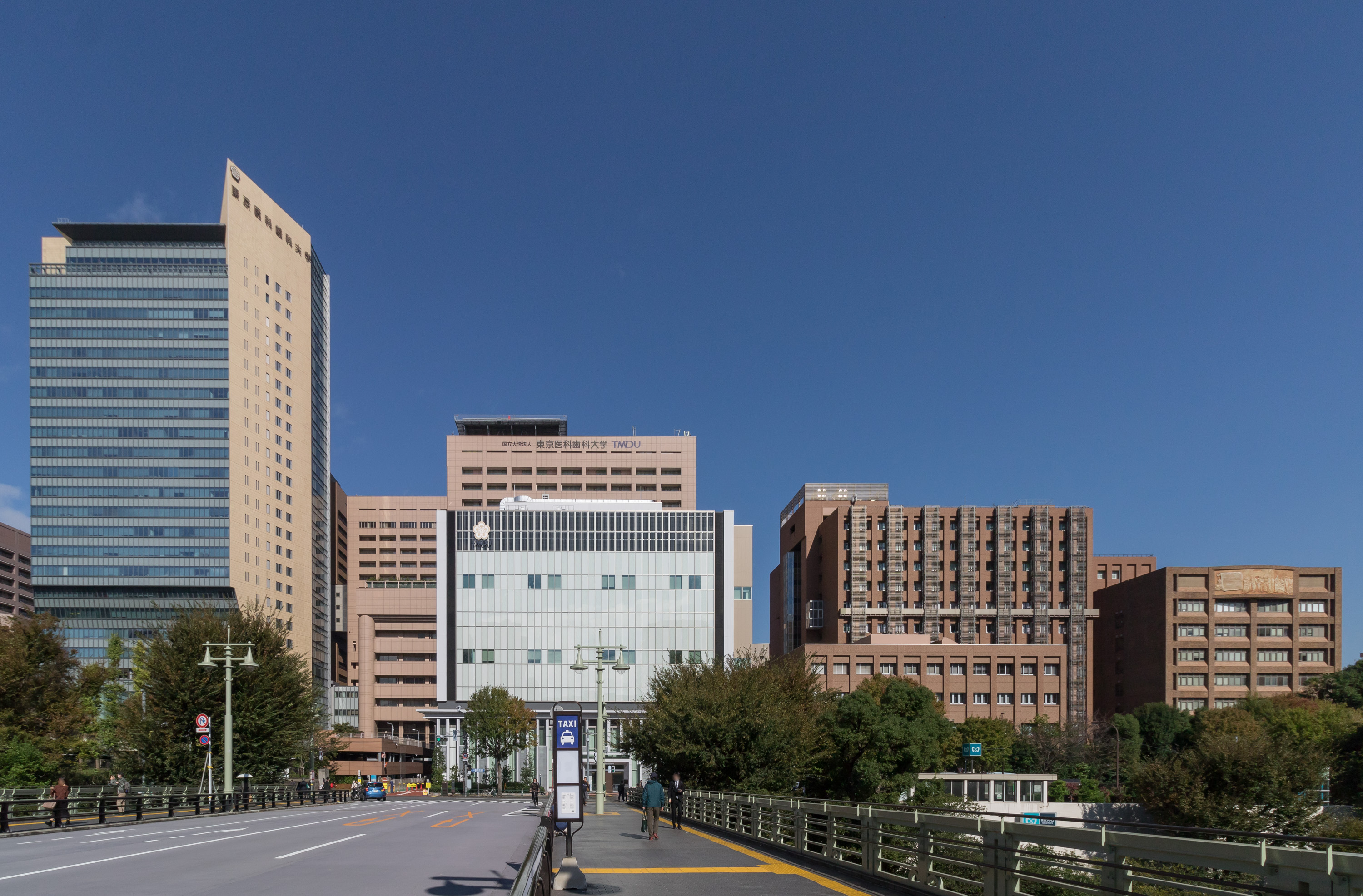

Geography
- Location: 1-5-45 Yushima, Bunkyo-ku, Tokyo, Japan

Organisation
- Type: University hospital
- Affiliated university: Institute of Science Tokyo

Services
- Standards: Joint Commission International
- Emergency department: Yes
- Beds: 813

History
- Founded: 1928

Links
- Website: tmd.ac.jp/medhospital/

Institute of Science Tokyo Hospital (Japanese: 東京科学大学病院, Hepburn: Tōkyō Kagaku Daigaku Byōin) or the Science Tokyo Hospital (科学大病院, Kagakudai Byōin) is a hospital in Bunkyo-ku, Tokyo, Japan that was founded in 1928.

== History ==
Until the end of September 2021, there were two hospitals: the Tokyo Medical and Dental University (TMDU) Faculty of Medicine Hospital and the TMDU Faculty of Dentistry Hospital.

In October 2021, these were merged to form the TMDU Hospital.

In October 2024, with the integration of TMDU and Tokyo Institute of Technology, it became the current "Institute of Science Tokyo Hospital".

== Overview ==
Science Tokyo Hospital is the only national university hospital in Tokyo that actively conducts clinical research aimed at comprehensive medical and dental integration.

In the medical department (Medical Services Division, formerly the Faculty of Medicine Hospital), the hospital specializes in the diagnosis and treatment of intractable diseases (broadly defined rare diseases, particularly malignant tumors, neurodegenerative diseases, cardiovascular diseases, autoimmune diseases, allergic disorders, genetic conditions, and lifestyle diseases). The department is also involved in the development of new treatments.

In the dental department (Dental Services Division, formerly the Faculty of Dentistry Hospital), the hospital recorded 447,403 outpatient visits and 17,550 inpatient admissions in 2014, making it the busiest dental hospital among all dental university hospitals nationwide.

== See also ==
- Institute of Science Tokyo
- List of university hospitals
- List of hospitals in Japan
