= Hideo Hosono =

Japanese scientist

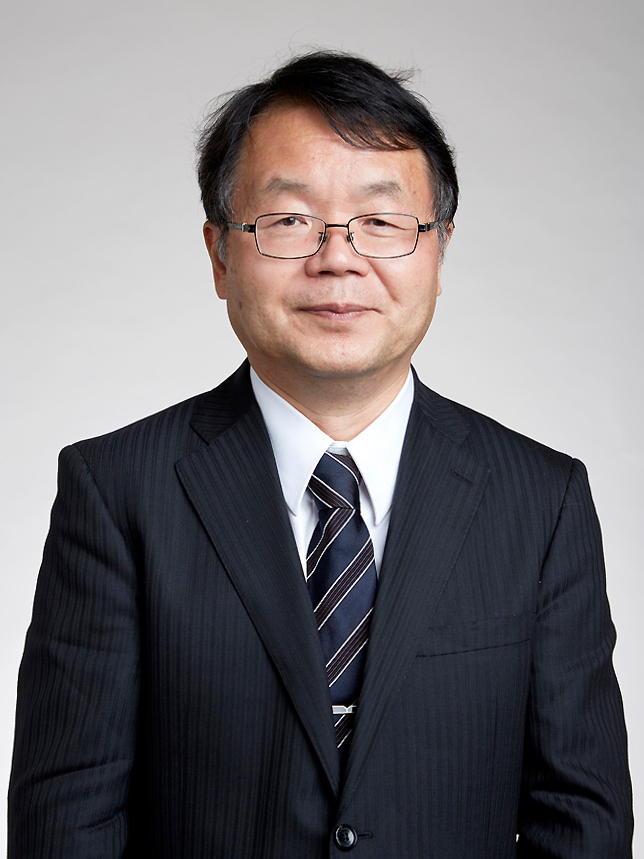
- Hosono in 2017
- Born: September 7, 1953 (age 72); Kawagoe, Saitama Prefecture, Japan
- Education: Tokyo Metropolitan University
- Known for: iron-based superconductors thin-film transistors
- Awards: Japan Prize; Medal of Honor (Purple Ribbon); Research Achievement Award (Japanese Society of Applied Physics); James C. McGroddy Prize for New Materials
- Scientific career
- Fields: Materials science
- Workplaces: Institute of Science Tokyo; Tokyo Institute of Technology; Nagoya Institute of Technology

Hideo Hosono (細野秀雄, Hosono Hideo; born September 7, 1953) is a Japanese material scientist most known for the discovery of iron-based superconductors.

Hosono, Hideki Shirakawa and Yoshinori Ohsumi are the three keynote speakers at the Institute of Integrated Research (IIR) founding lecture at the Institute of Science Tokyo.

== Early life and education ==
Hosono was born in September 1953 in Saitama Prefecture, Japan, one of the satellite cities of Tokyo. Dropped out of high school (National Institute of Technology, Tokyo College) in 1974, graduated from the Department of Industrial Chemistry of Tokyo Metropolitan University (TMU) in 1977, and obtained a doctorate in engineering from TMU in 1982.

== Career and research ==
Hosono is also a pioneer in developing transparent oxide semiconductors: he proposed a material design concept for a transparent amorphous oxide semiconductor (TAOS) with large electron mobility, demonstrated the excellent performance of TAOS thin-film transistors for next generation displays and successfully converted a cement constituent 12CaO·7Al2O3 into transparent semiconductor, metal, and eventually superconductors.

== Awards and honors ==
- 2009 – Bernd T. Matthias Prize for Superconductivity
- 2009 – Medal of Honor (Purple Ribbon)
- 2012 – Nishina Memorial Prize
- 2013 – Thomson Reuters Citation Laureates
- 2015 – Imperial Prize of the Japan Academy
- 2016 – Japan Prize
- 2017 – Elected a Foreign Member of the Royal Society
- 2018 – Materials Research Society's Von Hippel Award
- 2019 - Asian Scientist 100, Asian Scientist
- 2022 – Eduard Rhein Technology Award

== Selected publications ==
According to the Web of Science, Hideo Hosono has co-authored 5 articles with more than 1000 citations each (as of September 2019):

- Kamihara, Y.; Watanabe, T.; Hirano, M.; Hosono, H. (2008). "Iron-Based Layered Superconductor La[O_{1−x}F_{x}]FeAs (x = 0.05–0.12) with T_{c}= 26 K". Journal of the American Chemical Society. 130 (11): 3296–7. doi:10.1021/ja800073m. PMID 18293989.
- Nomura, K.; Ohta, H.; Takagi, A.; Kamiya, T.; Hirano, M.; Hosono, H. (2004). "Room-temperature fabrication of transparent flexible thin-film transistors using amorphous oxide semiconductors". Nature. 432 (7016): 488–92. Bibcode:2004Natur.432..488N. doi:10.1038/nature03090. PMID 15565150. S2CID 4302869.
- Kawazoe, H.; Yasukawa, M.; Hyodo, H.; Kurita, M.; Yanagi, H.; Hosono, H. (1997). "P-type electrical conduction in transparent thin films of CuAlO_{2}". Nature. 389 (6654): 939. Bibcode:1997Natur.389..939K. doi:10.1038/40087. S2CID 4405808.
- Nomura, K; Ohta, H; Ueda, K; Kamiya, T; Hirano, M; Hosono, H (2003). "Thin-film transistor fabricated in single-crystalline transparent oxide semiconductor". Science. 300 (5623): 1269–72. Bibcode:2003Sci...300.1269N. doi:10.1126/science.1083212. JSTOR 3834084. PMID 12764192. S2CID 20791905.
- Kamiya, Toshio; Nomura, Kenji; Hosono, Hideo (2016). "Present status of amorphous In–Ga–Zn–O thin-film transistors". Science and Technology of Advanced Materials. 11 (4) 044305. Bibcode:2010STAdM..11d4305K. doi:10.1088/1468-6996/11/4/044305. PMC 5090337. PMID 27877346.
