= Satoshi Matsuoka =

Japanese computer scientist

- Born: Matsuoka Satoshi
- Occupation: Computer scientist
- Known for: Head of the Riken Center for Computational Science
- Notable work: TSUBAME supercomputer

Satoshi Matsuoka (松岡 聡, Matsuoka Satoshi) is a Japanese computer scientist and the current head of the Riken Center for Computational Science (R-CCS) at RIKEN, the largest Supercomputing center in Japan.

== Biography ==
Matsuoka graduated from Musashi Senior High School in 1982 and the University of Tokyo in 1986. In his student days, he worked for HAL Laboratory, a Japanese video game company, and co-developed Pinball and Rollerball for Nintendo Entertainment System with Satoru Iwata. In 1989, Matsuoka became a research associate and lecturer at the University of Tokyo. In 1993, he submitted his thesis on "Language Features for Extensibility and Re-use in Concurrent Object-Oriented Languages" and acquired his Ph.D. in Science. He went on to become an assistant professor at Tokyo Institute of Technology in 1996 and a full professor in 2001. He also became a visiting professor at the Japanese National Institute of Informatics in 2002, and a fellow of the Association for Computing Machinery in 2011.

Matsuoka was the lead developer of the TSUBAME supercomputer program during his stay at the Global Scientific Information and Computing Center (GSIC) of the Tokyo Institute of Technology. On April 1, 2018, he was appointed as the new director of the RIKEN Center for Computational Science (R-CCS), where he oversees the development of the Fugaku a.k.a. "Post-K" project tasked with building the successor of the K computer.

== Awards ==
- Information Processing Society of Japan Sakai Award (1999)
- Gordon Bell Prize (2011)
- Japan Society for the Promotion of Science Prize (2005)
- Sidney Fernbach Award (2014)
- Seymour Cray Award (2022)
