= Institute of Science Tokyo Library =

Academic library in Tokyo, Japan

- 東京科学大学図書館
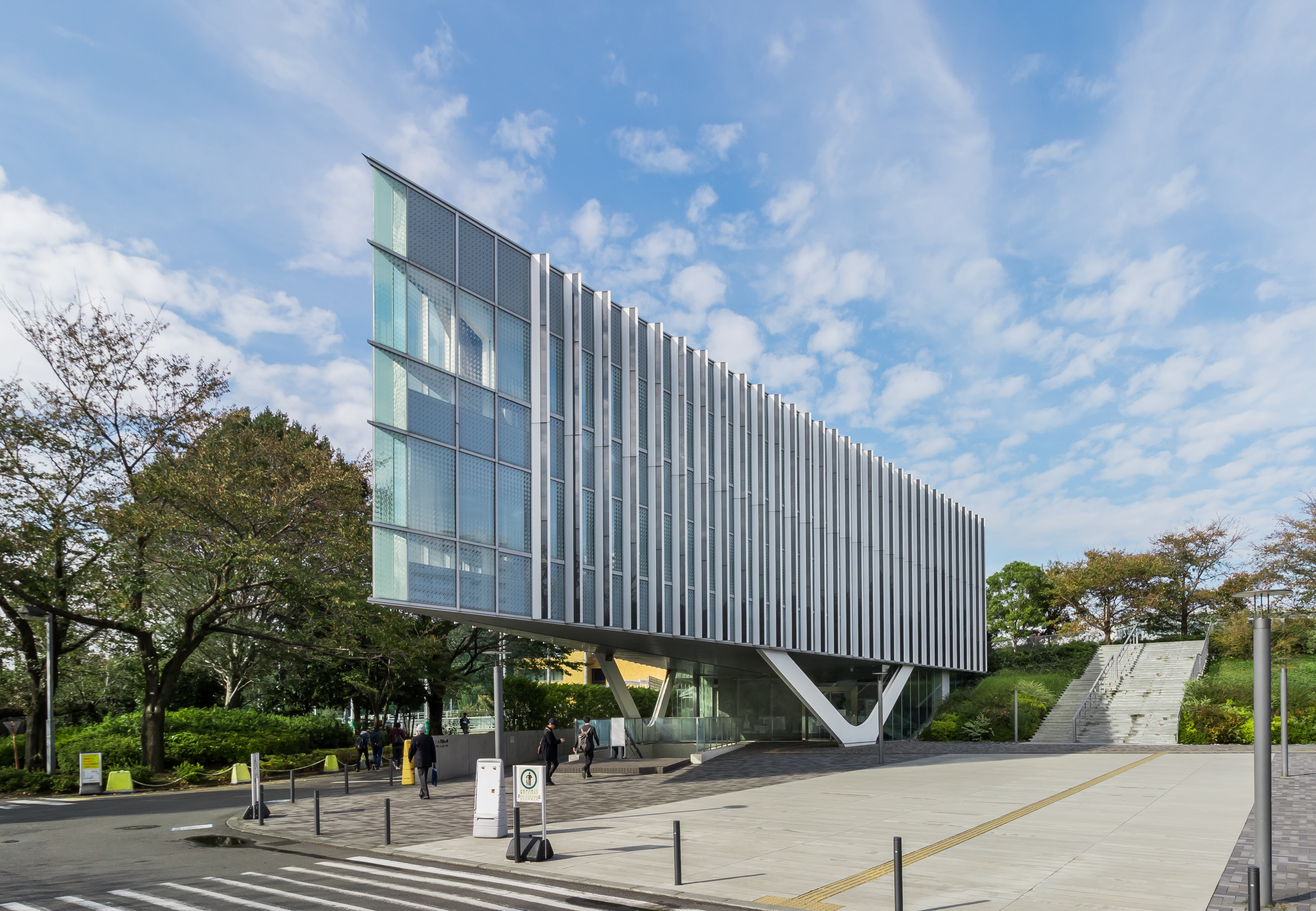
- Ookayama Library built in 2011
- 35.606529224014906°N 139.6849702356143°E
- Location: Tokyo, Japan
- Established: 1882

Other information
- Website: https://www.isct.ac.jp/en/001/about/organizations/library

Institute of Science Tokyo Library (Japanese: 東京科学大学図書館) is the academic library associated with Institute of Science Tokyo. It was established by the merger of Tokyo Institute of Technology and Tokyo Medical and Dental University in 2024, and houses more than 1 million books in its four library locations in Ookayama, Suzukakedai, Ochanomizu, and Konodai. Its predecessor, the Tokyo Institute of Technology Library, was established in 1882, and the Tokyo Medical and Dental University Library in 1946.

== Tokyo Institute of Technology Library ==
Tokyo Institute of Technology Library was founded in 1882 as part of the Tokyo Vocational School, and at the time had nearly 4700 books. In the following year, expansion legislation was passed on its behalf, and it grew to over 457,000 m^{2} by 1902.

A year later the library lost nearly 28,000 books to the Great Kantō earthquake in 1923. It was rebuilt in Ookayama, Meguro, making its size 862 m^{2}. At the founding of the Tokyo Institute of Technology in 1929, it was legally recognised. Following World War II in 1948, a library committee was formed. During the 1970s a second library building was constructed in Nagatsuta.

In 1986, two years after the personal computer was popularized, the library began a system of online journal searches with LAN. Its online journal started in 1995. Four years later, Tokyo Institute of Technology digital library was introduced. In 2002, the library began its GIF projects, while in 2007, the library began a T2R2 system. A new library building was constructed in 2011.

In The library remains extensive. It currently subscribes to approximately 19,000 books and 3,300 journals, while maintaining a collection of over 793,000 books and 26,000 journals (including 10,000 online).
