= Asia-Oceania Top University League on Engineering =

AOTULE
- Formation: 2007
- Type: League of Asia-Oceania Engineering Universities
- Headquarters: Institute of Science Tokyo; Tokyo, Japan
- Region served: Asia and Oceania
- Members: 13 universities' engineering faculty, staff and students
- Executive Chairman: Rotates yearly to prior Conf. host dean
- Staff: Steering Chairman, Treasure, Secretary

The Asia-Oceania Top University League on Engineering (abbreviated AOTULE, pronounced "our tool") is a league consisting of 13 engineering faculties within Asia and Oceania universities. AOTULE's mission is to improve the quality of its member's educational programs and promote research activity among members primarily through exchange of information between deans, faculty members and administration staff at its annual meeting. It also organizes graduate student research exchange programs and conferences where graduate students present their latest research results in an interdisciplinary format.

== History ==
The seeds for forming AOTULE began in 2006 with discussions between senior engineering faculty at Tokyo Institute of Technology and Monash University. to promote graduate engineering student mobility within Asia and Oceania universities similar to the ERASMUS+ program offered by EU universities that is funded by the European commission. AOTULE was subsequently founded in 2007 at the Tokyo Institute of Technology, by holding its inaugural meeting where participating Engineering Deans signed a memorandum of understanding. Each Fall since 2007, an AOTULE member has organized and hosted the annual AOTULE student conference, administration staff and Dean's meeting as noted below.

== Student research exchanges and overseas visits ==
To promote student mobility, AOTULE members organize intra-AOTULE student short stays and research exchanges varying in length from one week at Chulalongkorn University to three months at Tokyo Institute of Technology. These exchanges facilitate global engineering, cross-cultural competencies, foreign language learning, and research experiences by students since the majority of AOTULE members' students live in countries where English is not the native language. AOTULE members such as Tokyo Tech's School of Engineering have used AOTULE as a test bed for creating new research exchange programs that are later broaden to university-wide programs with research university partners in the US and EU. Recently, there has been growing numbers of double degree graduate programs signed between AOTULE member institutions to allow participating graduate students to obtain two degrees by completing graduation requirements at two institutions. This allows double degree participants an opportunity to learn more about the host country where they are studying, undertake a research project in greater depth and establish a greater network of peers than that provided by a short term exchanges.

== Members ==
Location	University or institute	Participating organization
Australia	The University of Melbourne	Faculty of Engineering and Information Technology
China	Tsinghua University	School of Aerospace Engineering
Hong Kong	Hong Kong University of Science and Technology	School of Engineering
India	Indian Institute of Technology Madras	School of Engineering
Indonesia	Bandung Institute of Technology	Faculty of Engineering
Japan	Institute of Science Tokyo	School of Engineering, School of Environment and Society, School of Materials and Chemical Technology
Malaysia	University of Malaya	Faculty of Engineering
Sri Lanka	University of Moratuwa	Faculty of Engineering
Singapore	Nanyang Technological University	College of Engineering
South Korea	KAIST	College of Engineering
Taiwan	National Taiwan University	College of Engineering College of Electrical Engineering and Computer Science
Thailand	Chulalongkorn University	Faculty of Engineering
Vietnam	Hanoi University of Science and Technology	Engineering Faculties

== Notes ==
- At Bandung Institute of Technology participants are the School of Electrical Engineering and Informatics, Faculty of Mechanical and Aerospace Engineering, Faculty of Industrial Technology, Faculty of Mining and Petroleum Engineering, and Faculty of Civil and Environmental Engineering.
- At Hanoi University of Science and Technology there are 16 schools which are eligible to participate in AOTULE activities.
- At the former Tokyo Institute of Technology which became the Institute of Science Tokyo in October 2024, there are 3 schools of engineering that participate in AOTULE activities.
