= David Tyrrell =

David Tyrrell may refer to:

- David Terrell (fighter) (born 1978), American mixed martial artist
- David Tyrrell (rugby league) (born 1988), Australian rugby league player
- David Terrell (safety) (born 1975), American football safety
- David Terrell (wide receiver) (born 1979), American football wide receiver
- David Tyrrell (physician) (1925–2005), British virologist
- D. Lorne Tyrrell (born 1943), Canadian physician
