= Noriko Osumi =

Japanese neuroscientist

- 大隅 典子
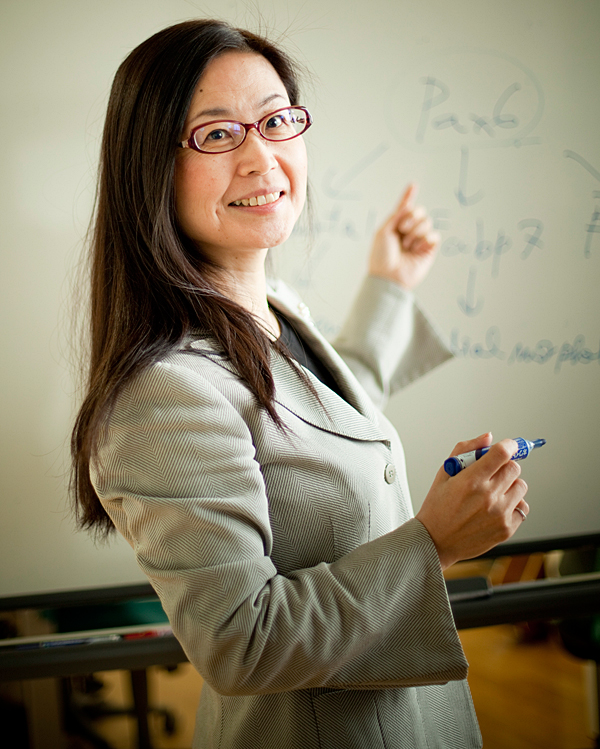
- Osumi at Tohoku University
- Born: 1960 (age 65–66); Kanagawa Prefecture, Japan
- Education: Tokyo Medical and Dental University
- Known for: Research on PAX6 and neural crest migration
- Awards: NISTEP Award (2006); Brilliant Female Researchers Award (2022)
- Scientific career
- Fields: Neuroscience, Developmental biology
- Workplaces: Tohoku University; National Center of Neurology and Psychiatry

Noriko Osumi (大隅 典子, Ōsumi Noriko; born 1960) is a Japanese neuroscientist. She is a professor of developmental neuroscience at the Tohoku University Graduate School of Medicine and was appointed as the university's first female Vice-president in 2018. She previously served as the president of the Molecular Biology Society of Japan from 2013 to 2014.

== Education and career ==
Osumi graduated from the School of Dentistry at Tokyo Medical and Dental University in 1985 and completed her PhD at the same institution in 1989. Her early research focused on the migration of neural crest cells and craniofacial morphogenesis.

In 1996, she became a section chief at the National Institute of Neuroscience within the National Center of Neurology and Psychiatry. In 1998, she joined Tohoku University as its first female professor in the Graduate School of Medicine. She has held several leadership roles at the university, including Director of the Core Center for Neuroscience and Chief Librarian of the Tohoku University Library.

== Research ==
Osumi's research focuses on the molecular mechanisms of brain development. She is known for her work on the PAX6 gene, demonstrating its role as a master regulator in both eye and brain development. Her laboratory also investigates the impact of paternal age and nutrition—specifically fatty acid signaling—on fetal brain development and its potential links to autism spectrum disorder and depression.

She is also involved in the Tohoku Medical Megabank Project, focusing on genomic analysis and science communication.

== Advocacy and personal life ==
Osumi is a prominent advocate for gender equality in the Japanese scientific community. Since 2006, she has served as a special advisor for gender equality at Tohoku University, promoting diversity in STEM fields.

She has often clarified that she is not a relative of the Nobel laureate Yoshinori Ohsumi, despite the similarity in their surnames.

== Selected publications ==
- Osumi-Yamashita N, Kuratani S, Eto K (1997). "Cranial anomaly of homozygous rSey rat is associated with a defect in the migration pathway of midbrain crest cells". Development, Growth & Differentiation. 39 (1): 53–67. doi:10.1046/j.1440-169X.1997.00007.x. PMID 9079035.
- Osumi N (2008). "Expression study of cadherin 7 and cadherin 20 in the embryonic and adult rat central nervous system". BMC Developmental Biology. 8 87. doi:10.1186/1471-213X-8-87. PMC 2564927. PMID 18801203.
- Sakayori N, Osumi N (2017). "The role of docosahexaenoic acid in brain development". Vitamins. 91 (9): 547–554. doi:10.20632/vso.91.9_547. PMID 28943446.
