= Earth–Life Science Institute =

Japanese research institute

- ELSI
- Type: department
- Established: 2012
- Affiliations: Institute of Science Tokyo
- Director: Kei Hirose (2012-2022), Yasuhito Sekine (2022-)
- Location: Meguro-ku, Tokyo, Japan
- Website: www.elsi.jp

Earth–Life Science Institute (ELSI) is an established independent permanent scientific research institute based at the Tokyo Institute of Technology (now Institute of Science Tokyo) in Japan. ELSI employs more than 70 scientists in disciplines ranging from astrophysics to biology, who perform collaborative research on the broad connections between the origin and evolution of planets and life.

== History ==
ELSI was established in 2012 with a charter to build a bridge between the Earth and Life sciences by rallying researchers around questions concerning the link between the origins of planets and life. ELSI has satellite-institutes at Ehime University, Harvard University, and the Institute for Advanced Study, and is currently led by Director Yasuhito Sekine and Vice Directors Tomoaki Matsuura and John Hernlund.

== Funding sources ==
Funding sources for the institute include a combination of support from Japan's World Premiere International Research Center Initiative (approximately $7M/year), a grant from the John Templeton Foundation to establish the ELSI Origins Network (EON, $5.6M for three years), a variety of project grants from the Japan Society for the Promotion of Science (JSPS), and anonymous private donations.

== Academics ==
=== Teaching and learning ===
ELSI offers Masters courses through Institute of Science Tokyo and PhD degrees supervised by staff.

=== Research ===
Research is primarily supported through JSPS grants, but also private & international sources.
