= John Dirks (physician) =

Canadian physician

John Dirks CM FRSC FRCPC
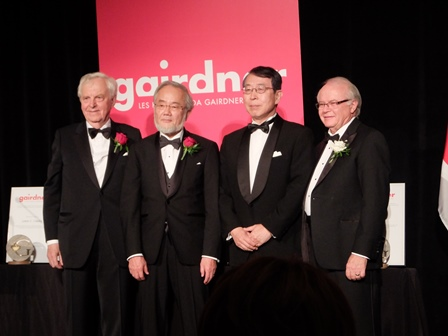
- Dr John Dirks with Yoshinori Ōsumi, Kenjirō Monji and D. Lorne Tyrrell (at the Royal Ontario Museum on October 29, 2015)

Dean of the University of Toronto Faculty of Medicine
- In office 1987–1991
- Preceded by: Frederick Lowy
- Succeeded by: G. Harvey Anderson (acting)

Personal details
- Education: University of Manitoba
- Scientific career
- Organization(s): Gairdner Foundation; University of Toronto
- Known for: Nephrology; Global Health
- Awards: Member of the Order of Canada; Queen Elizabeth II Diamond Jubilee Medal

John Herbert Dirks (born August 20, 1933) is a Canadian physician who served as the dean of the University of Toronto Faculty of Medicine from 1987 to 1991.

== Overview ==
Born to a Mennonite family in Winnipeg, Manitoba, Dirks studied medicine at the University of Manitoba and received a fellowship in medicine from the Royal College of Physicians in 1963. From 1963 to 1965, he trained in nephrology research at the National Institutes of Health. He then became the head of the nephrology division at the Royal Victoria Hospital. In 1976, Dirks became head of the Department of Medicine at the University of British Columbia, and in 1987, he became Dean of Medicine at the University of Toronto. From 1994 to 1996, he was Dean-Rector at the Aga Khan University in Pakistan. In 1993, he became president and scientific director at the Gairdner Foundation and also serves as chair of the Medical Advisory Board and of the Canada Gairdner Wightman Committee for the foundation.

Dirks was named to the Canadian Medical Hall of Fame in 2012 and was named to the Order of Canada in 2006.
