= Top Global University Project =

Japanese university funding project

The Top Global University Project (スーパーグローバル大学創成支援, Sūpā gurōbaru daigaku sōsei shien) was a funding project by the Japanese government that began in 2014 and ended in 2024. The project aimed to enhance the globalization of the country's public and private universities so that graduates can "walk into positions of global leadership". The project was sometimes referred to as 'TGUP'; it has also been (mis)translated directly in English as "Super Global Universities", and therefore referred to on some university websites as 'SGU' or 'SGUP'.

== History ==
The Top Global Universities Project was launched in 2014, as the latest in a series of education ministry-led project initiatives to internationalize higher education in Japan and increase student mobility. An early, major project in this series started in 2009, when the Japanese Ministry of Education, Culture, Sports, Science and Technology (MEXT) began a program to encourage foreign students to study at Japanese universities. The program was called Global 30. Thirteen universities participated by creating and offering English-only undergraduate programs. It was felt that English-only programs would encourage foreign students to study in Japan. Studying Japanese was an option, but not a requirement. The program was concluded in 2014 and replaced with the Top Global University project, which shifted the focus off English-language offerings, but still maintains strong implications of increased English medium instruction in Japanese universities. Along the way, other major projects included The Re-inventing Japan project (2011–present), which was designed to promote Japanese students going abroad and international students coming to Japan, and foster globally-active human resources (known as global jinzai); and the Go Global Japan project (2012–2016), which was designed to encourage Japanese students to study abroad.

== Program ==
The Top Global University Project began as an initiative of Prime Minister Shinzō Abe, who stated its aim was to help more of Japan's universities rank in the top 100 worldwide. This requires the hiring of more foreign professors and increasing foreign student attendance at Japanese universities. According to Martin Ince of QS World University Rankings, Prime Minister Abe stated, "the number of foreign students at a university will define its success".

The program is slated to run for 10 years from 2014 to 2023. Its total budget target was originally ¥7.7 billion ($US 77 million) per year. The funds will be used to hire faculty who are either foreigners or Japanese nationals who have graduated from foreign universities. Designated universities will also establish curricula for undergraduate degree programs, provide financial support for international students, and actively recruit students worldwide.

The Ministry of Education, Culture, Sports, Science and Technology (MEXT) adopted a two-track approach, ranking institutions in one of two categories.

- Type A (Top Type) - The Top Type is for world-class universities that have the potential to be ranked in the top 100 in world university rankings. Each Type A university will receive ¥500 million ($US 4.3 million) annually for up to ten years.
- Type B (Global Traction Type) - The Global Traction Type is for innovative universities that lead the internationalization of Japanese society, based on continuous improvement. Each Type B university will receive ¥200-300 million ($US 1.7-2.5 million) annually for up to 10 years.

== Selected universities ==
In September 2014, the ministry announced the selection of 37 schools for the Top Global University Project.

=== Type A (Top Type) (13 universities) ===
- National universities
  - Hiroshima University
  - Hokkaido University
  - Tokyo Institute of Technology
  - Tokyo Medical and Dental University
  - Kyoto University
  - Kyushu University
  - Nagoya University
  - Tohoku University
  - University of Osaka
  - University of Tsukuba
  - University of Tokyo
- Private universities
  - Keio University
  - Waseda University

=== Type B (Global Traction Type) (24 universities) ===
- National universities
  - Chiba University
  - Tokyo University of Foreign Studies
  - Tokyo University of the Arts
  - Nagaoka University of Technology
  - Kanazawa University
  - Toyohashi University of Technology
  - Kyoto Institute of Technology
  - Nara Institute of Science and Technology
  - Okayama University
  - Kumamoto University
- Prefectural universities
  - Akita International University
  - University of Aizu
- Private universities
  - International Christian University
  - Shibaura Institute of Technology
  - Sophia University
  - Toyo University
  - Hosei University
  - Meiji University
  - Rikkyo University
  - Soka University
  - International University of Japan
  - Ritsumeikan University
  - Kwansei Gakuin University
  - Ritsumeikan Asia Pacific University
