= Laboratory for Zero-Carbon Energy (Science Tokyo) =

Laboratory for Zero-Carbon Energy (Institute of Science Tokyo) is a Japanese research laboratory for energy. It was founded in 1956 for the study of nuclear science and its application.

== History ==
=== Nuclear Energy period ===
In 1959, the Atomic Science Laboratory, Cockcroft-Walton Accelerator and Atlas Mass Spectrograph were installed in RLNR, Tokyo Institute of Technology.

Throughout the 1960s, many research laboratories were added, such as Radio Isotope Laboratory and Nuclear Power Laboratory, and many related buildings were constructed. In 1990 it was reorganised into 3 divisions, Energy Engineering, Mass Transmutation Engineering and System and Safety Engineering. Later the International Nuclear Research Cooperation Centre and Research Cooperation Division were added.

It consists of 10 professors, 1 guest professor, 10 associate professors, 12 assistant professors, 5 technical staff and 4 official staff. Since 2004, at the time when the national universities in Japan were semi-privatised, the purpose of its research has been global energy and environmental problems. The 6 main research fields are Frontier Research on Dispersion-Type Nuclear Energy, Safety and Control of Nuclear Fusion, Utilization of Nuclear Energy with High Efficiency, Safety, Development of Nuclear Frontiers by Accelerators (including studies on environment with ion beams) and Self-consistent Nuclear Energy System (SCNES).

=== Zero-Carbon Energy period ===
In 2014, the "Advanced Research and Education Program for Nuclear Decommissioning" was adopted, marking a shift towards addressing nuclear decommissioning challenges.

In 2016, the Laboratory for Advanced Nuclear Energy underwent system modifications under the Institute of Innovative Research. This included the abolition of the Center for Research into Innovative Nuclear Energy Systems and the integration of the International Nuclear Research Cooperation Center, signaling a move away from active nuclear energy research.

In 2021, the Laboratory for Zero-Carbon Energy was reorganized under the Institute of Innovative Research, reflecting a focus on sustainable energy.

In 2024, the Laboratory for Zero-Carbon Energy became part of the Institute of Integrated Research under the newly formed Institute of Science Tokyo, completing the transition towards zero-carbon energy research.

== See also ==
- Institute of Science Tokyo
