= Yoshinori Ohsumi =

Japanese cell biologist (born 1945)

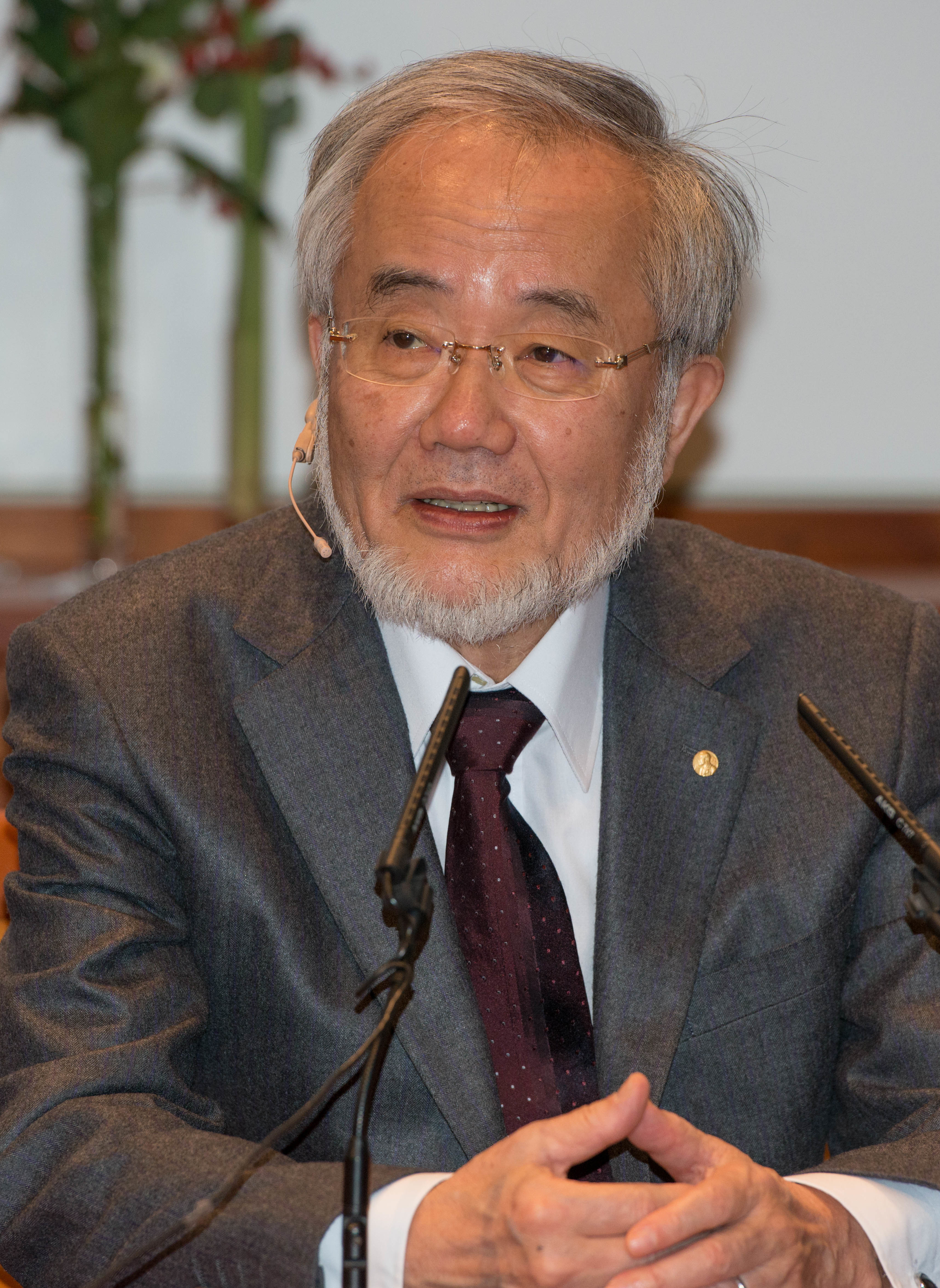
- Ohsumi in 2016
- Born: February 9, 1945 (age 81); Fukuoka, Japan
- Education: University of Tokyo (BSc, DSc)
- Known for: Autophagy
- Awards: Kyoto Prize (2012); Gairdner Foundation International Award (2015); Nobel Prize in Physiology or Medicine (2016); Breakthrough Prize in Life Sciences (2017)
- Scientific career
- Fields: Cell biologist
- Workplaces: Institute of Science Tokyo; Tokyo Institute of Technology
- Website: www.ohsumilab.aro.iri.titech.ac.jp/english.html

Yoshinori Ohsumi (大隅 良典, Ōsumi Yoshinori; born February 9, 1945) is a Japanese cell biologist specializing in autophagy, the process that cells use to destroy and recycle cellular components.

Ohsumi is a professor at Institute of Science Tokyo's Institute of Innovative Research. He received the Kyoto Prize for Basic Sciences in 2012, the 2016 Nobel Prize in Physiology or Medicine, and the 2017 Breakthrough Prize in Life Sciences for his discoveries of mechanisms for autophagy.

== Biography ==
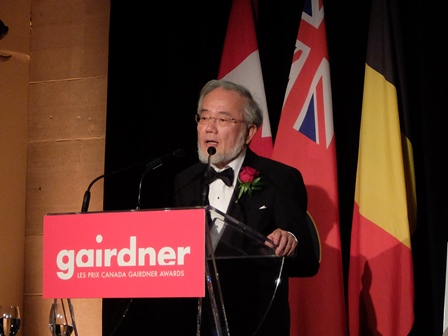
Ohsumi addressed at Gairdner Foundation International Award Ceremony (at the Royal Ontario Museum in October 2015)

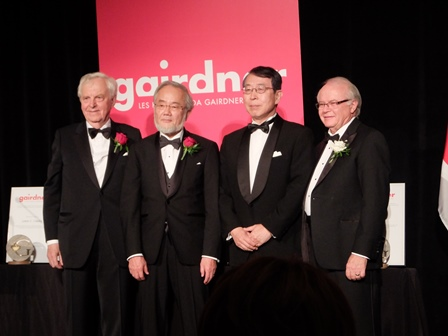
with John Dirks, Kenjirō Monji and D. Lorne Tyrrell

Ohsumi was born on February 9, 1945, in Fukuoka. He received a B.Sci. in 1967 and a D.Sci. in 1974, both from the University of Tokyo. In 1974–77 he was a postdoctoral fellow at the Rockefeller University in New York City.

He returned to the University of Tokyo in 1977 as a research associate; he was appointed Lecturer there in 1986, and promoted to Associate Professor in 1988. In 1996, he moved to the National Institute for Basic Biology, Japan in Okazaki City, where he was appointed as a professor. From 2004 to 2009, he was also professor at the Graduate University for Advanced Studies in Hayama. In 2009, he transitioned to a three-way appointment as an emeritus professor at the National Institute for Basic Biology and at the Graduate University for Advanced Studies, and a professorship at the Advanced Research Organization, Integrated Research Institute, Tokyo Institute of Technology (Tokyo Tech). After his retirement in 2014, he continued to serve as Professor at Institute of Innovative Research, Tokyo Institute of Technology. Currently, he is head of the Cell Biology Research Unit, Institute of Innovative Research, Tokyo Institute of Technology.

Christian de Duve coined the term autophagy in 1963 whereas Ohsumi began his work in 1988. Prior to that time, less than 20 papers per year were published on this subject. During the 1990s, Ohsumi's group described the morphology of autophagy in yeast, and performed mutational screening on yeast cells that identified essential genes for cells to be capable of autophagy.

In 2016, he was awarded the Nobel Prize in Physiology or Medicine "for his discoveries of mechanisms for autophagy". He is the 25th Japanese person to be awarded a Nobel Prize. Ohsumi's spouse Mariko, a Professor at Teikyo University of Science, collaborated on his research. She is a co-author of many academic papers with him. In 2024 Ohsumi donated his Nobel Prize medal and diploma to the Institute of Science Tokyo to "serve as a strong stimulus for young researchers who seek to create the future".

== Recognition ==
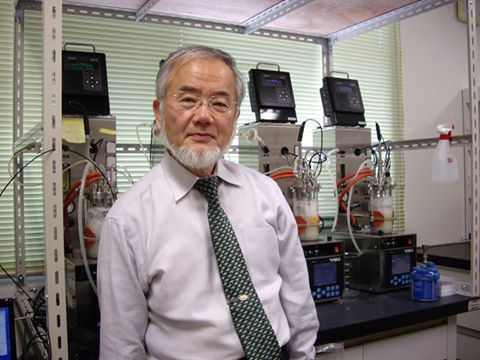
Ohsumi in his Tokyo Tech lab

- 2005 – Fujihara Award, Fujihara Foundation of Science
- 2006 – Japan Academy Prize, Japan Academy
- 2007 – Science Award, Botanical Society of Japan
- 2008 – Asahi Prize, Asahi Shimbun
- 2012 – Kyoto Prize in Basic Sciences
- 2013 – Thomson Reuters Citation Laureate
- 2015 – Gairdner Foundation International Award
- 2015 – International Prize for Biology
- 2015 – Keio Medical Science Prize
- 2015 – Person of Cultural Merit
- 2015 – Rosenstiel Award
- 2016 – Wiley Prize in Biomedical Sciences
- 2016 – Dr. Paul Janssen Award for Biomedical Research
- 2016 – Nobel Prize in Physiology or Medicine
- 2016 and 2017 – Asian Scientist 100, Asian Scientist
- 2017 – Breakthrough Prize in Life Sciences
- 2017 – Honorary doctorate from Kyoto University, Japan

== Selected publications ==
His original findings about autophagy in yeast cells:

- Takeshige K; Baba M; Tsuboi S; Noda T; Ohsumi Y (October 1992). "Autophagy in yeast demonstrated with proteinase-deficient mutants and conditions for its induction". Journal of Cell Biology. 119 (2): 301–11. doi:10.1083/jcb.119.2.301. ISSN 0021-9525. JSTOR 1615399. PMC 2289660. PMID 1400575. Wikidata Q29614187.

Follow up with more research on yeast:

- Baba M; Takeshige K; Baba N; Ohsumi Y (March 1, 1994). "Ultrastructural analysis of the autophagic process in yeast: detection of autophagosomes and their characterization". Journal of Cell Biology. 124 (6): 903–913. doi:10.1083/jcb.124.6.903. ISSN 0021-9525. JSTOR 1616094. PMC 2119983. PMID 8132712. Wikidata Q34337565.

Others

- M Tsukada; Y Ohsumi (October 25, 1993). "Isolation and characterization of autophagy-defective mutants of Saccharomyces cerevisiae". FEBS Letters. 333 (1–2): 169–74. doi:10.1016/0014-5793(93)80398-e. ISSN 0014-5793. PMID 8224160. S2CID 46017791. Wikidata Q27935838.
- N Mizushima; T Noda; T Yoshimori; et al. (September 24, 1998). "A protein conjugation system essential for autophagy". Nature. 395 (6700): 395–8. Bibcode:1998Natur.395..395M. doi:10.1038/26506. ISSN 1476-4687. PMID 9759731. S2CID 204997310. Wikidata Q27940154.
- Y Kabeya; N Mizushima; T Ueno; et al. (November 1, 2000). "LC3, a mammalian homologue of yeast Apg8p, is localized in autophagosome membranes after processing". The EMBO Journal. 19 (21): 5720–8. doi:10.1093/emboj/19.21.5720. ISSN 0261-4189. PMC 305793. PMID 11060023. Wikidata Q24597817.
- Y Ichimura; T Kirisako; T Takao; et al. (November 23, 2000). "A ubiquitin-like system mediates protein lipidation". Nature. 408 (6811): 488–92. Bibcode:2000Natur.408..488I. doi:10.1038/35044114. ISSN 1476-4687. PMID 11100732. S2CID 4428142. Wikidata Q27934137.
- Y Ohsumi (March 2001). "Molecular dissection of autophagy: two ubiquitin-like systems". Nature Reviews Molecular Cell Biology. 2 (3): 211–6. doi:10.1038/35056522. ISSN 1471-0072. PMID 11265251. S2CID 38001477. Wikidata Q28206420.
- Kuma A; Hatano M; Matsui M; et al. (December 23, 2004). "The role of autophagy during the early neonatal starvation period". Nature. 432 (7020): 1032–6. Bibcode:2004Natur.432.1032K. doi:10.1038/nature03029. ISSN 1476-4687. PMID 15525940. S2CID 4424974. Wikidata Q29547489.
- Suzuki, Sho W.; Onodera, Jun; Ohsumi, Yoshinori (February 25, 2011). "Starvation Induced Cell Death in Autophagy-Defective Yeast Mutants Is Caused by Mitochondria Dysfunction". PLoS ONE. 6 (2) e17412. doi:10.1371/journal.pone.0017412. ISSN 1932-6203. PMC 3045454. PMID 21364763.
- Takao Hanada; Nobuo N Noda; Yoshinori Satomi; Yoshinobu Ichimura; Yuko Fujioka; Toshifumi Takao; Fuyuhiko Inagaki; Yoshinori Ohsumi (December 28, 2007). "The Atg12-Atg5 conjugate has a novel E3-like activity for protein lipidation in autophagy". Journal of Biological Chemistry. 282 (52): 37298–302. doi:10.1074/jbc.c700195200. ISSN 0021-9258. PMID 17986448. Wikidata Q27933717.
- Michitaro Shibata; Kazusato Oikawa; Kohki Yoshimoto; et al. (December 24, 2013). "Highly oxidized peroxisomes are selectively degraded via autophagy in Arabidopsis". The Plant Cell. 25 (12): 4967–4983. doi:10.1105/tpc.113.116947. ISSN 1040-4651. JSTOR 43190612. PMC 3903999. PMID 24368788. Wikidata Q34394370.
- Hayashi Yamamoto; Takayuki Shima; Masaya Yamaguchi; et al. (October 6, 2015). "The Thermotolerant Yeast Kluyveromyces marxianus Is a Useful Organism for Structural and Biochemical Studies of Autophagy". Journal of Biological Chemistry. 290 (49): 29506–29518. doi:10.1074/jbc.m115.684233. ISSN 0021-9258. PMC 4705951. PMID 26442587. Wikidata Q34497110.
- Hayashi Yamamoto; Yuko Fujioka; Sho W Suzuki; et al. (July 11, 2016). "The Intrinsically Disordered Protein Atg13 Mediates Supramolecular Assembly of Autophagy Initiation Complexes". Developmental Cell. 38 (1): 86–99. doi:10.1016/j.devcel.2016.06.015. ISSN 1534-5807. PMID 27404361. Wikidata Q27718642.

== See also ==
- List of Japanese Nobel laureates
- List of Nobel laureates affiliated with the University of Tokyo
