= D. Lorne Tyrrell =

Canadian physician

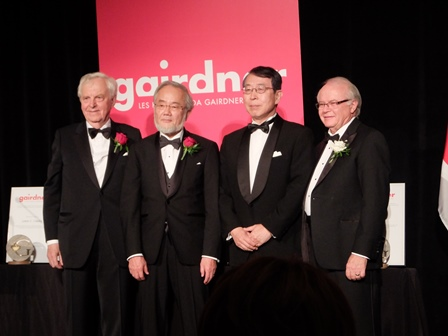
with John Dirks, Yoshinori Ōsumi and Kenjirō Monji (at the Royal Ontario Museum on October 29, 2015)

David Lorne John Tyrrell CC AOE FRSC (born 10 February 1943) is a Canadian physician.

== Overview ==
Born on February 10, 1943, in Edmonton, Alberta, he grew up on the family farm near Duffield and studied at the University of Alberta. Tyrrell interned at the University of Alberta Hospital and then went on to earn a PhD in pharmacology from Queen's University in 1972. He returned to Alberta in 1975 to train in internal medicine. From 1982 to 1994, he was director of the Infectious Diseases division and later the Department of Medical Microbiology and Immunology at the University of Alberta. In 1994, he became dean of the faculty of medicine at the university. In 2010, he secured a large donation for the university which established the Li Ka Shing Institute of Virology.

Tyrrell's research into viral hepatitis lead to the development of the oral antiviral drug lamivudine. This treatment enabled the use of liver transplants for persons infected with Hepatitis B. In collaboration with Norman Miles Kneteman (University of Alberta, Department of Surgery), Tyrrell and his team contributed to the development of a mouse with a humanized liver to be used for testing drugs to treat Hepatitis C.

He was named to the Alberta Order of Excellence in 2000 and became an officer in the Order of Canada in 2002. Tyrrell became a fellow of the Royal Society of Canada in 2004. In 2009, he was named chair of the board of directors for the Gairdner Foundation. Tyrrell was inducted into the Canadian Medical Hall of Fame in 2011. He was a Killam Prize winner in 2015. He was promoted to a Companion of the Order of Canada on December 31, 2025.
