= Institute of Science Tokyo =

Public university in Tokyo, Japan

- 東京科学大学
- Motto: Advancing science and human wellbeing
- Predecessors: Tokyo Institute of Technology; Tokyo Medical and Dental University
- Type: Public university
- Established: 1 October 2024
- President: Naoto Ohtake
- Faculty: 1,887
- Total staff: 5,627
- Students: 13,358 (2023)
- Undergraduates: 6,242
- Postgraduates: 7,116
- Location: 2 Chome-12-1 Ookayama, Meguro, Tokyo, 152-8550, Japan; 35.6066°N 139.6838°E
- Campus: Urban
- Colours: Science Blue
- Website: www.isct.ac.jp

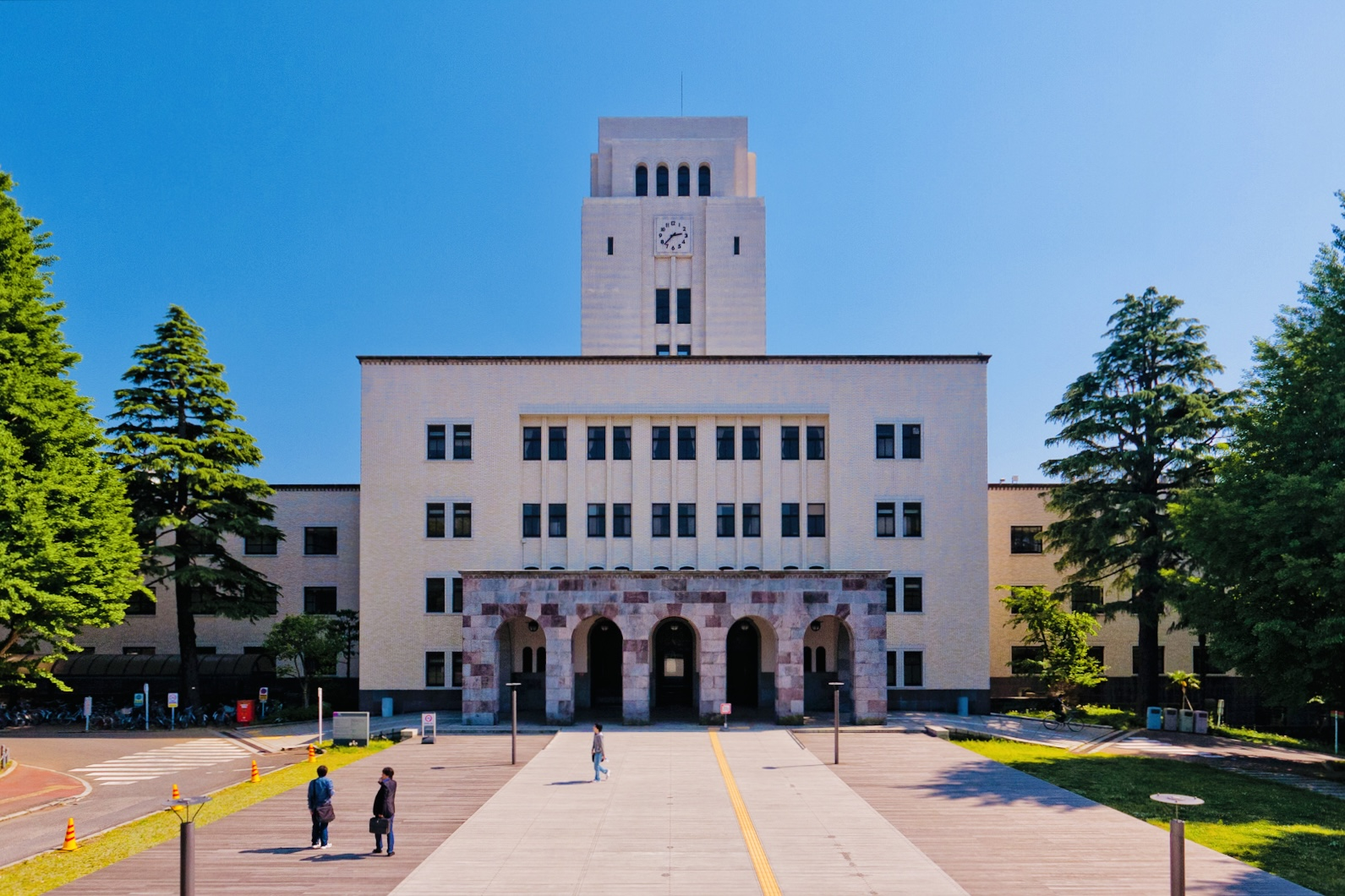
Institute of Science Tokyo

The Institute of Science Tokyo (東京科学大学, Tōkyō kagaku daigaku; branded as Science Tokyo) is a public research university in Tokyo, Japan. It was officially established on 1 October 2024, by a merger between the Tokyo Institute of Technology and Tokyo Medical and Dental University. The main campus is located in Ookayama, Meguro, with satellite campuses in Yokohama, Minato-ku, Bunkyo-ku, and Ichikawa.

== History ==
The Tokyo Institute of Technology and Tokyo Medical and Dental University signed an agreement to merge into one university in October 2022. In November and December 2022, the two universities publicly solicited names for the new university on their websites.

On 19 January 2023, it was decided for the new university to use the name "Institute of Science Tokyo" (東京科学大学).

On 31 October 2023, the Japanese cabinet decided to amend the National University Corporation Act. The former National University Corporation Tokyo Institute of Technology (国立大学法人東京工業大学) was renamed the National University Corporation Institute of Science Tokyo (国立大学法人東京科学大学), and the National University Corporation Tokyo Medical and Dental University (国立大学法人東京医科歯科大学) was dissolved at the same time. After being passed by the National Diet of Japan, the amendment took effect on 1 October 2024. The new university's headquarters is located in Meguro-ku, Tokyo, where the former Tokyo Institute of Technology headquarters was located.

=== Timeline ===
- May 1881: Tokyo Vocational School, the predecessor of Tokyo Institute of Technology, is established
- Oct 1928: Tokyo Higher School of Dentistry, the predecessor of Tokyo Medical and Dental University, is established as first national dental training institution
- Apr 1929: Status of Tokyo Higher Technical School elevated to degree-conferring university, later renamed Tokyo Institute of Technology
- Aug 1946: Tokyo Medical and Dental University is established
- Oct 2024: Tokyo Institute of Technology and Tokyo Medical and Dental University merge to form Institute of Science Tokyo

== Organization ==
The academic structure of the institute consists of 6 schools, 2 graduate schools, 2 faculties, and an institute for liberal arts.

University rankings
Global
THE	General	166
QS	General	85
ARWU	Research	101–150

Regional
THE Asia (Asia version)	General	=32
QS Asia (Asia version)	General	30

National

=== Schools ===
- School of Science
  - Department of Mathematics
  - Department of Physics
  - Department of Chemistry
  - Department of Earth and Planetary Science
- School of Engineering
  - Department of Mechanical Engineering
  - Department of Systems and Control Engineering
  - Department of Electrical and Electric Engineering
  - Department of Information and Communication Engineering
  - Department of Industrial Engineering and Economics
- School of Materials and Chemical Technology
  - Department of Life Science and Technology
- School of Computing
  - Department of Mathematical and Computing Science
  - Department of Computer Science
- School of Life Science and Technology
  - Department of Life Science and Technology
- School of Environment and Society
  - Department of Architecture and Building Engineering
  - Department of Civil and Environmental Engineering
  - Department of Transdisciplinary Science and Engineering
  - Department of Social and Human Sciences
  - Technology Innovation Management / Department of Innovation Science

=== Graduate Schools ===
- Graduate School of Medical and Dental Sciences
  - Medical and Dental Sciences Track (Doctoral Program)
  - Joint Degree Program (Doctoral Program)
  - Biomedical Sciences and Engineering Track (Doctoral Program)
  - Health Sciences and Biomedical Engineering (Master's Program)
  - Medical and Dental Science and Technology Master of Medical Administration (Master's Program)
  - Master of Public Health in Global Health Course (Master's Program)
- Graduate School of Health Care Sciences
  - Nursing Innovative Science Major (integrated five-year doctoral program)

=== Faculties ===
- Faculty of Medicine
  - School of Medicine (6-year)
  - School of Health Care Sciences (4-year)
    - Track of Nursing Science
    - Track of Medical Technology
- Faculty of Dentistry
  - School of Dentistry (6-year)
  - School of Oral Health Care Sciences (4-year)
    - Track of Oral Health Care Sciences
    - Track of Oral Health Engineering

=== Institute for Liberal Arts ===
- Institute for Liberal Arts

=== Research Organizations ===
- Institute of Integrated Research
  - Materials and Structures Laboratory (MSL)
  - Laboratory for Chemistry and Life Science (CLS)
  - Laboratory for Future Interdisciplinary Research of Science and Technology (FIRST)
  - Laboratory for Biomaterials and Bioengineering (LBB)
  - Laboratory for Zero-Carbon Energy (ZC)
  - Medical Research Laboratory (MRL)
- Institute of Future Science
  - Earth-Life Science Institute (ELSI)
- Institute of New Industry Incubation

=== Other organizations ===
- Institute of Science Tokyo High School
- Institute of Science Tokyo Hospital
- Institute-Wide Education Centers
  - Center for Entrepreneurship Education
  - Center for Data Science and Artificial Intelligence Education
  - Center for Healthcare Education
  - Professional Academy
  - Center for Education in Healthcare Innovation
  - Academy for Leadership
  - Academy for Convergence of Materials and Informatics
  - Academy of Super Smart Society
  - Academy of Energy and Informatics
- Institute-wide Support Centers
  - Student Healthcare Center
  - Student Support Center
  - Admissions Center
  - Center for Innovative Teaching and Learning
  - Research Development Center
  - Research Infrastructure Management Center
  - Center for Innovation Management
  - Center for Medical Innovation
  - Center for Innovation Design
  - Library
  - Center for Information Infrastructure
  - Radiation Safety and Management Center
  - Environmental Safety Center
  - Faculty and Staff Healthcare Center
  - International Support Center
  - Museum and Archives

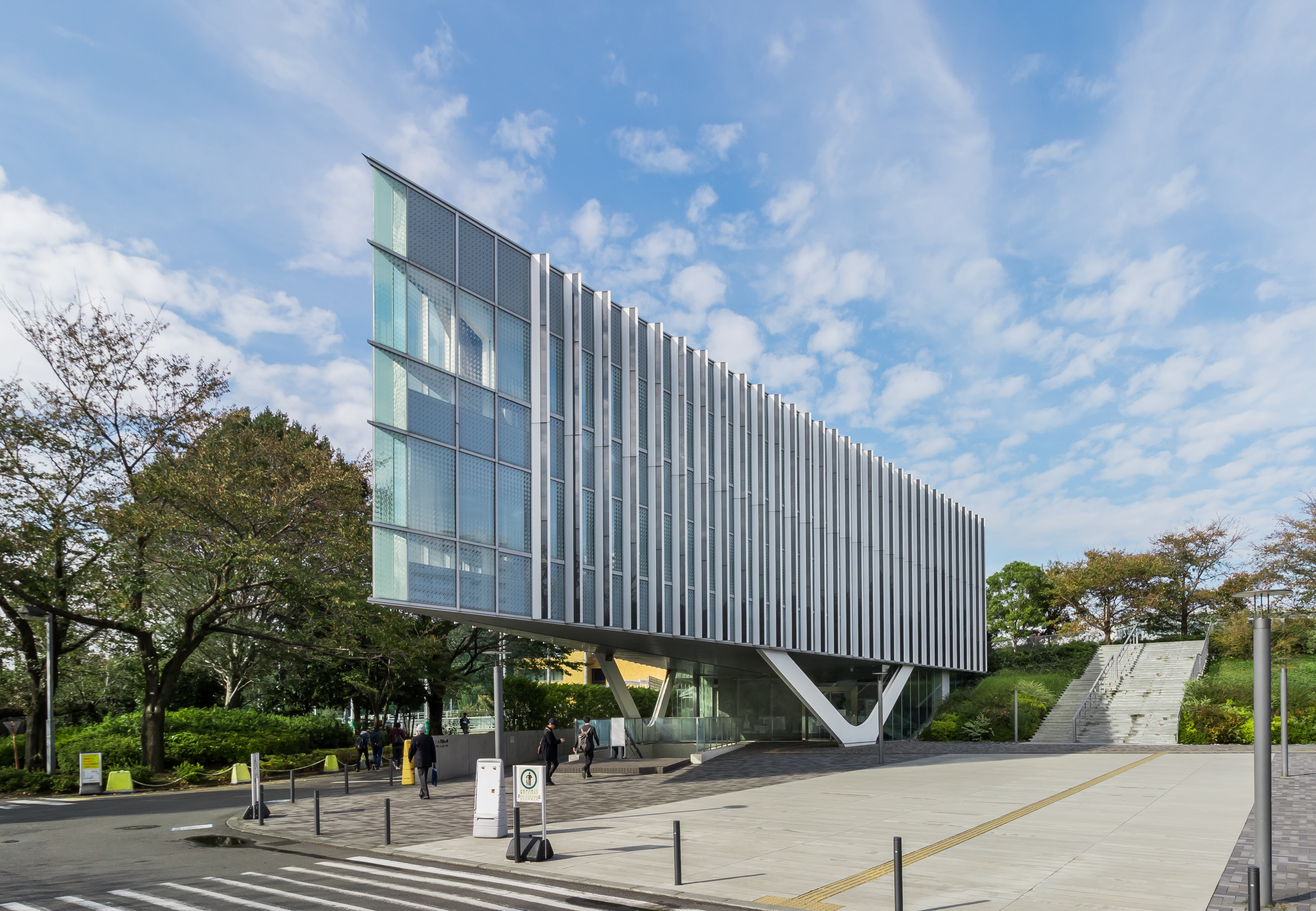
Ookayama Library built in 2011

== Campuses ==
The Institute of Science Tokyo has six campuses and several overseas bases.

=== Ookayama campus ===
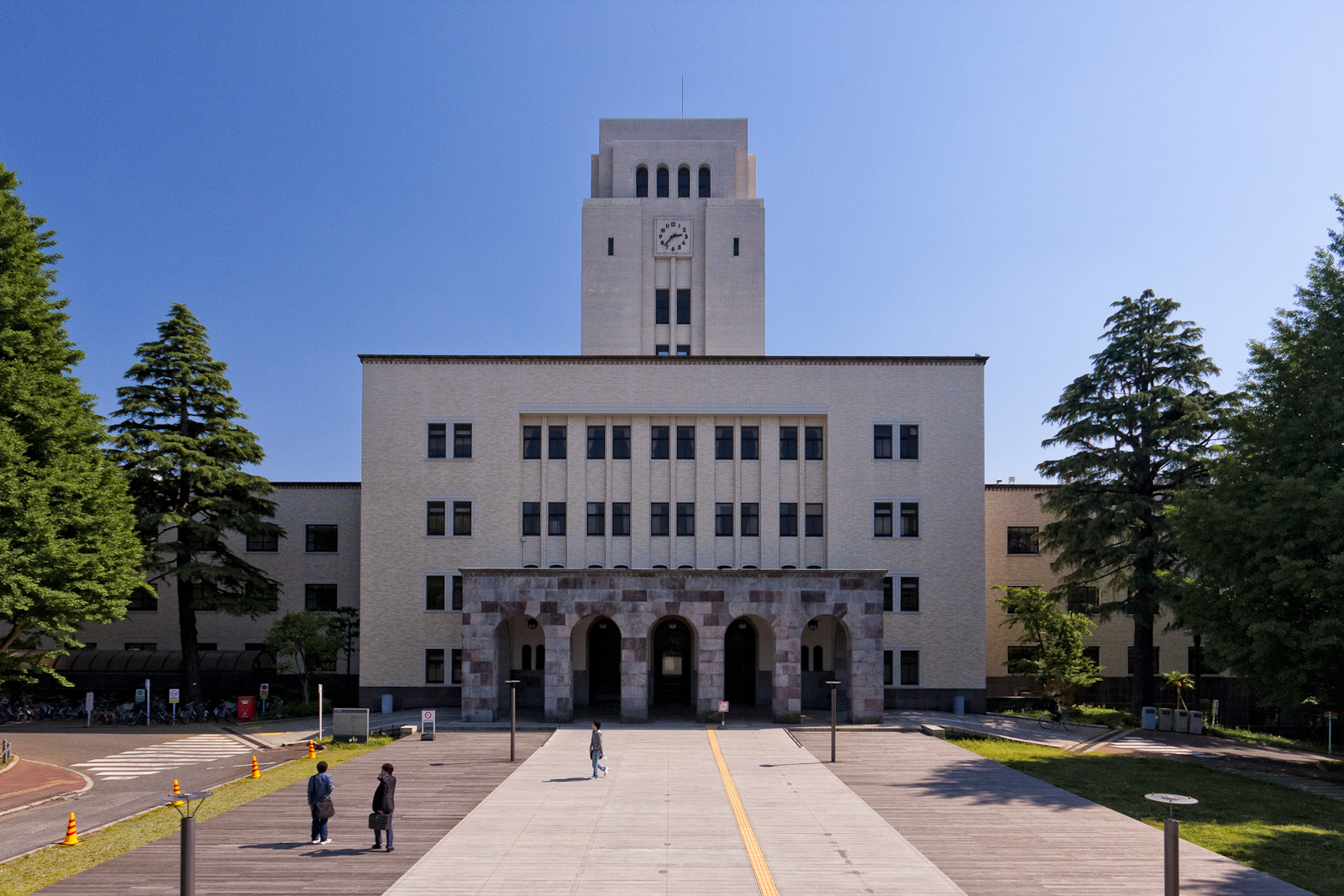
The main building of Ookayama Campus

=== Suzukakedai campus ===
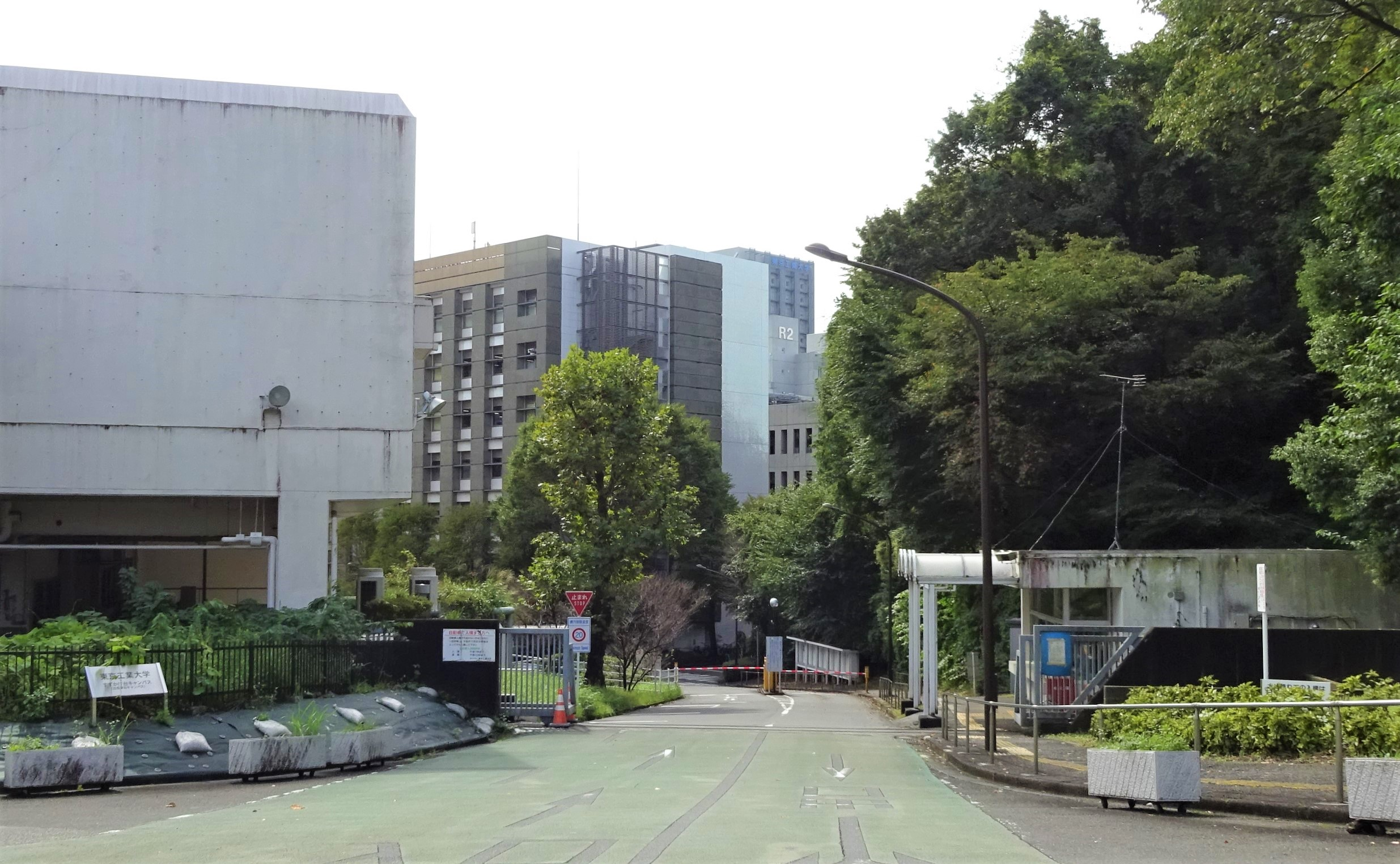
The gate of Suzukakedai Campus

=== Yushima Campus ===
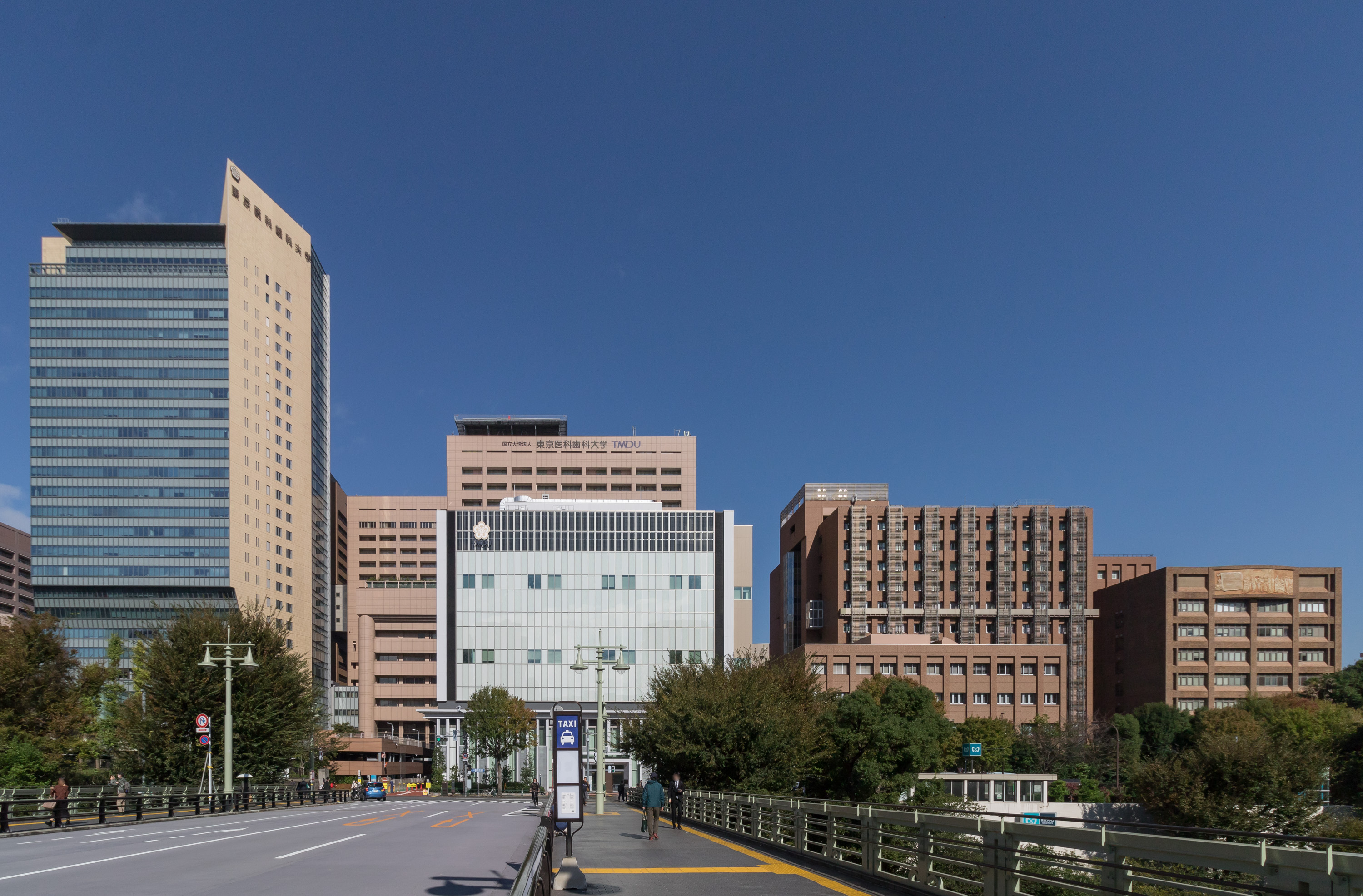
Yushima Campus

Yushima (湯島, Yushima) Campus is the main campus of medical and dental school located in Bunkyō, close to Ochanomizu Station, which contains the main university hospital buildings and research facilities including the 126m-tall M&D tower. The Yushima Campus was originally part of the site of Tokyo Women's Higher Normal School (now Ochanomizu University), which was rented intermittently. During the time of the Tokyo Higher Normal School for Dentistry (the old system), the need for building expansion prompted the Ministry of Education to relocate the Tokyo Women's Higher Normal School to Otsuka, Bunkyo-ku in 1930, thus expanding the main campus. Present, the Yushima and Surugadai campuses are located on a limited amount of land and are densely packed with high-rise buildings with a maximum building-to-land ratio. In particular, the research building is a high-rise building, giving it a unique appearance for a national research institute. The ground area is 45,090m^{2}, building area is 273,054m^{2}.

=== Surugadai Campus ===
Surugadai (駿河台, Surugadai) Campus is also located close to Ochanomizu Station and houses Institute of Biomaterials and Bioengineering, M&D data center and the part of Medical Research Institute. The ground area is 5,597m^{2}, building area is 18,028m^{2}.

=== Konodai Campus ===
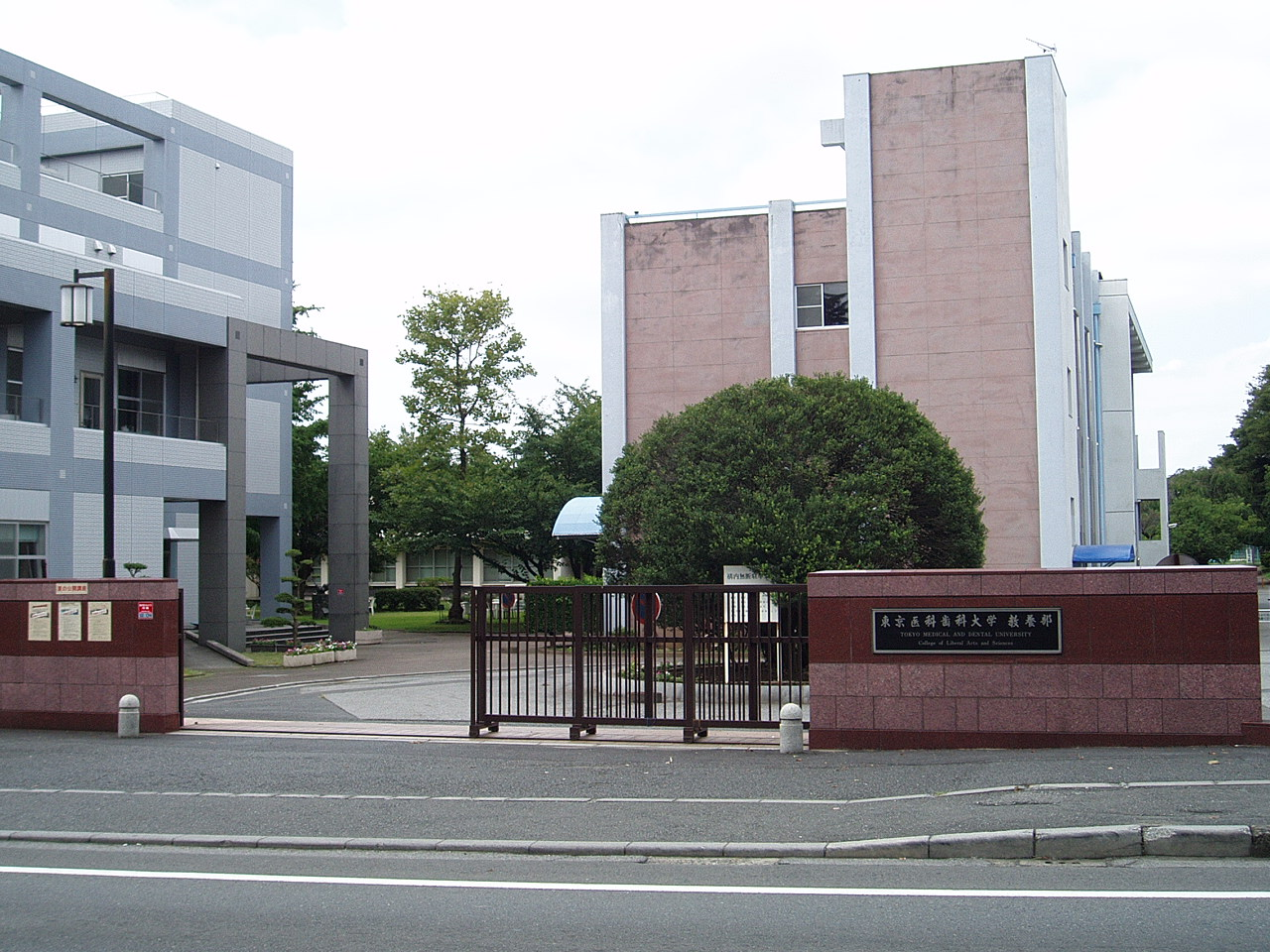
The gate of Konodai Campus

Konodai (国府台, Kōnodai) Campus is where undergraduate medical and dental students start their university studies and is home to the former Faculty of Liberal Arts, the Kohnodai Library, student dormitories, grounds and gymnasium, and other facilities. This campus is located in Ichikawa City, Chiba Prefecture, about 40 minutes from Yushima Campus by train. The ground area is 61,049m^{2}, building area is 13,965m^{2}.

=== Overseas bases ===
- Ghana-Science Tokyo Research Collaboration Center (located in Noguchi Memorial Institute for Medical Research）
- (Thailand) CU-Science Tokyo Research and Education Collaboration Center
- (Chile) Latin American Collaborative Research Center (LACRC)
- (Thailand) Science Tokyo-MU Partnership Siriraj Office
- (Thailand) Science Tokyo ANNEX Bangkok
- (Germany) Science Tokyo ANNEX Aachen
- (United States) Science Tokyo ANNEX Berkeley
- (Philippines) PHILIPPINES OFFICE (Manila)
- (China) CHINA OFFICE (Beijing)
- (Egypt) EGYPT E-JUST OFFICE (Alexandria)

== Notable people ==
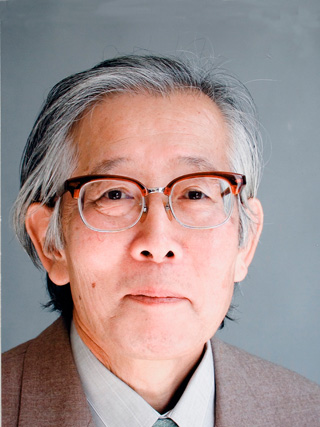
Hideki Shirakawa, Tokyo Tech alumnus, chemist, 2000 Nobel Prize in Chemistry winner.

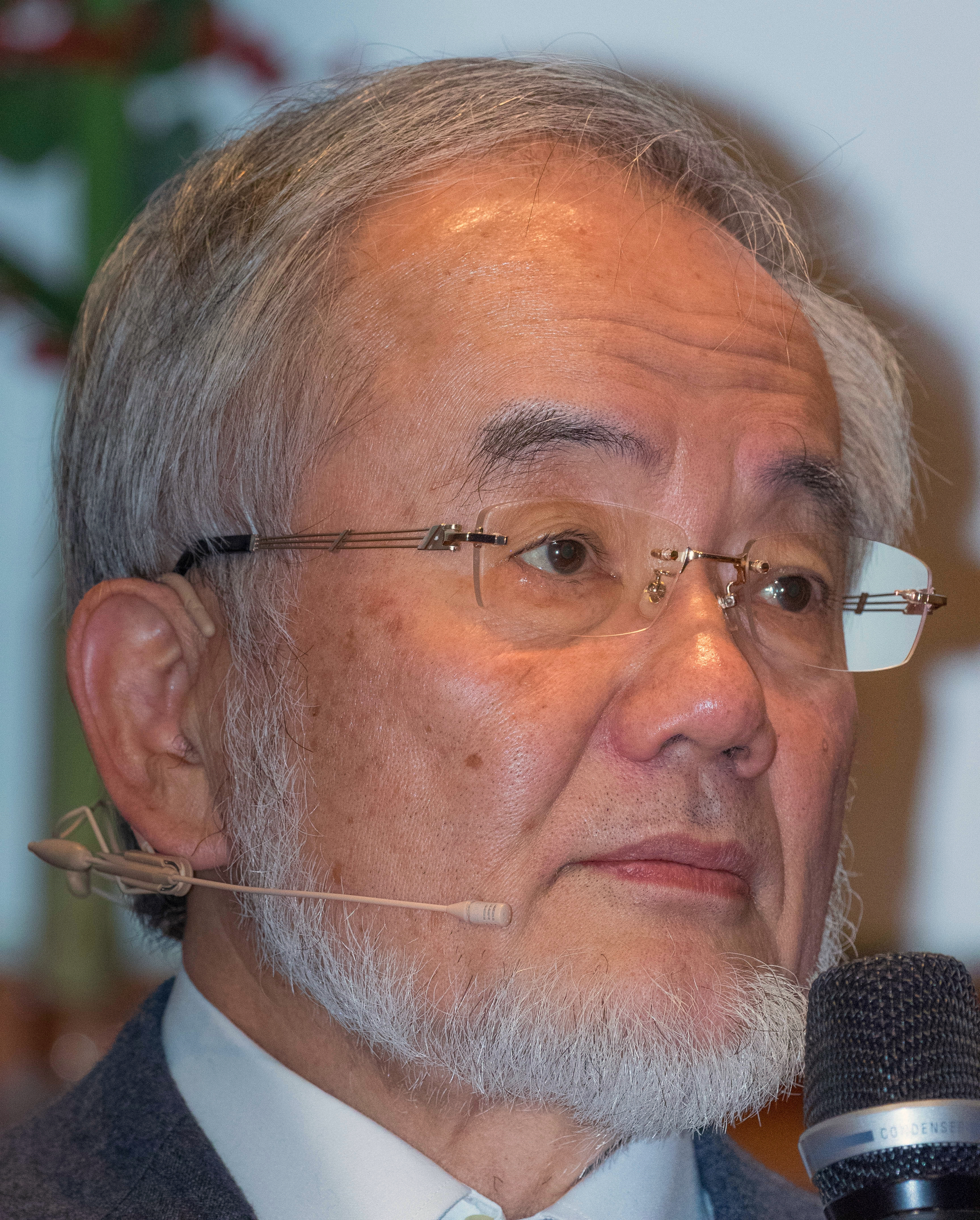
Yoshinori Ohsumi, professor, cell biologist, 2016 Nobel Prize in Physiology or Medicine winner.

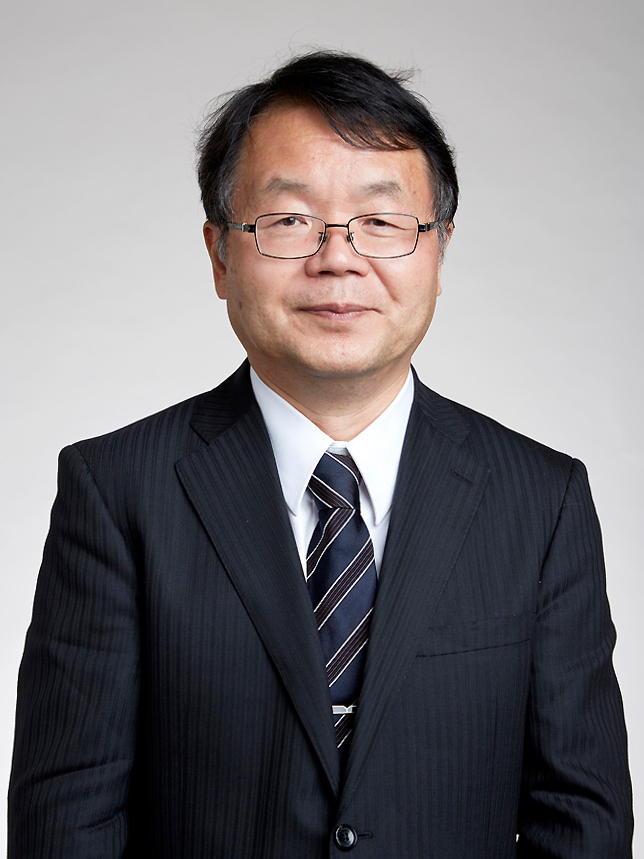
Hideo Hosono, professor, material scientist, discoverer of iron-based superconductors.

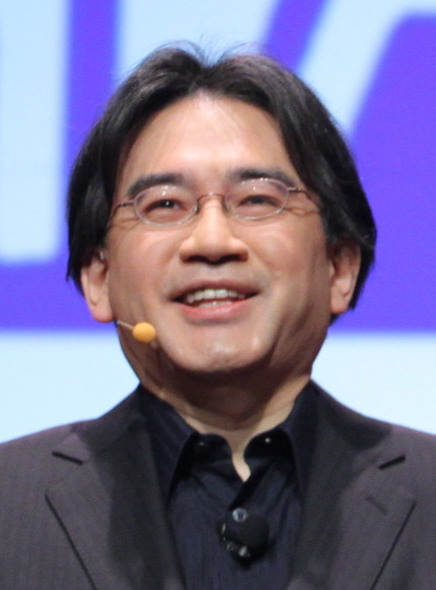
Satoru Iwata, Tokyo Tech alumnus, the CEO of Nintendo.

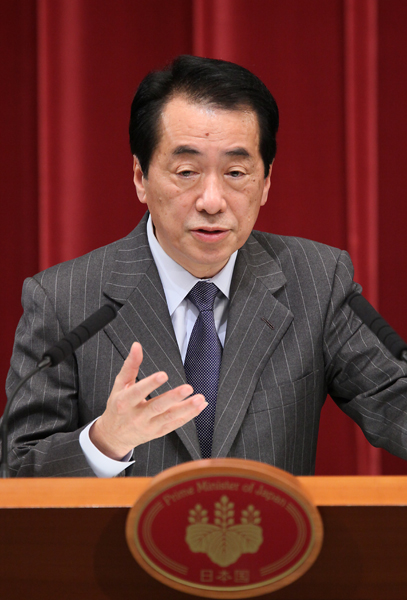
Naoto Kan, Tokyo Tech alumnus, 94th Prime Minister of Japan.

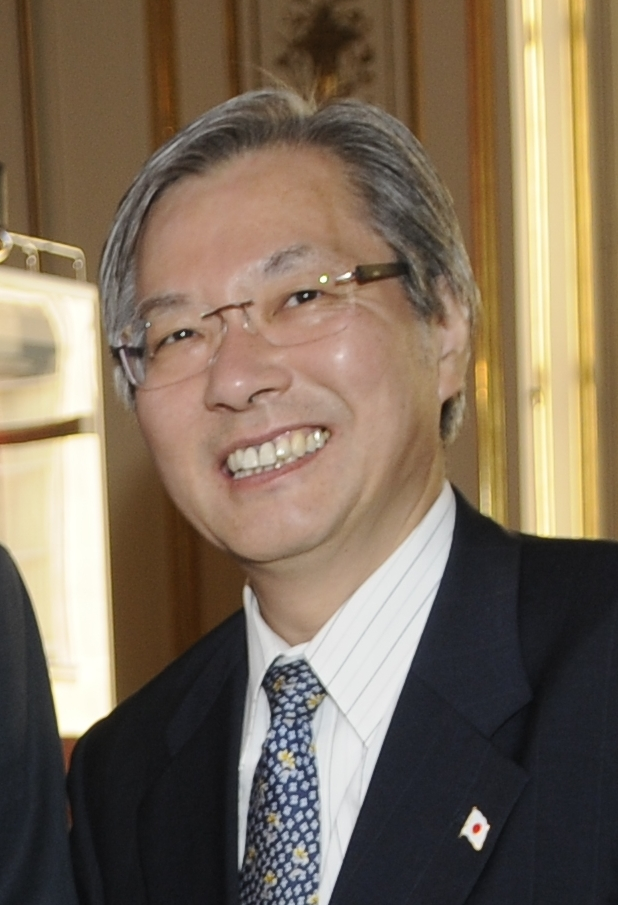
Tadamichi Yamamoto, Tokyo Tech alumnus, the UN Secretary-General's Special Representative for Afghanistan.

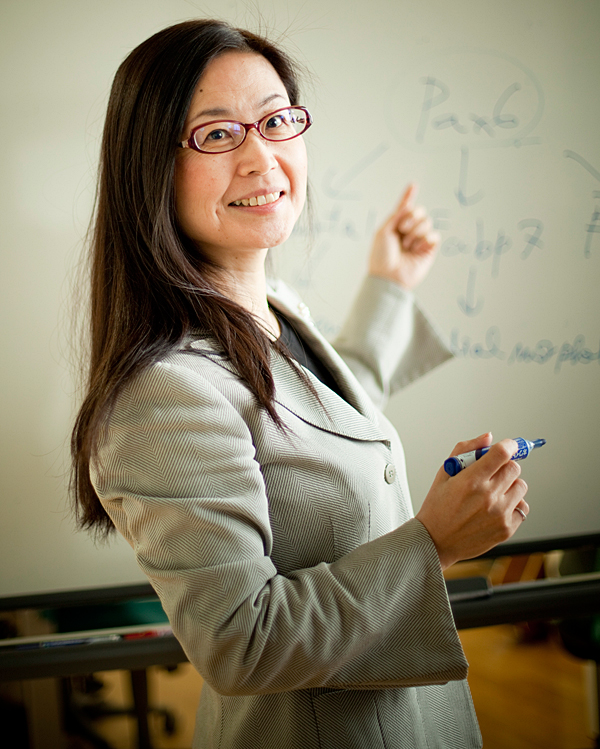
Noriko Osumi, TMDU alumnus, neuroscientist, Vice-president of Tohoku University.

== See also ==
- Institute of Science Tokyo Hospital
