= Tokyo Medical and Dental University =

Former public university in Tokyo, Japan

Coordinates: 35°42′5″N 139°45′55″E

- 東京医科歯科大学
- Motto: 知と癒しの匠を創造する
- Motto in English: Cultivating Professionals with Knowledge and Humanity
- Type: Public university
- Active: 12 October 1928–1 October 2024
- Location: Bunkyō, Tokyo, Japan
- Campus: Urban
- Colors: Bloom Gold; Mission Blue
- Mascot: None
- Website: tmd.ac.jp

Tokyo Medical and Dental University (東京医科歯科大学, Tōkyō ika shika daigaku) was a public university in Bunkyō, Tokyo, Japan. It merged with the Tokyo Institute of Technology to form the Institute of Science Tokyo on 1 October 2024.

Established in 1928, Tokyo Medical and Dental University was the oldest national school of dentistry in Japan. TMDU was one of top 9 Designated National University and selected as a Top Type university of Top Global University Project by the Japanese government, and offers baccalaureate and graduate degrees in medicine, dentistry, and related fields. In 2023, the QS world university rankings ranked TMDU 3rd in the world for dentistry and 136th in the world for medicine.

== History ==
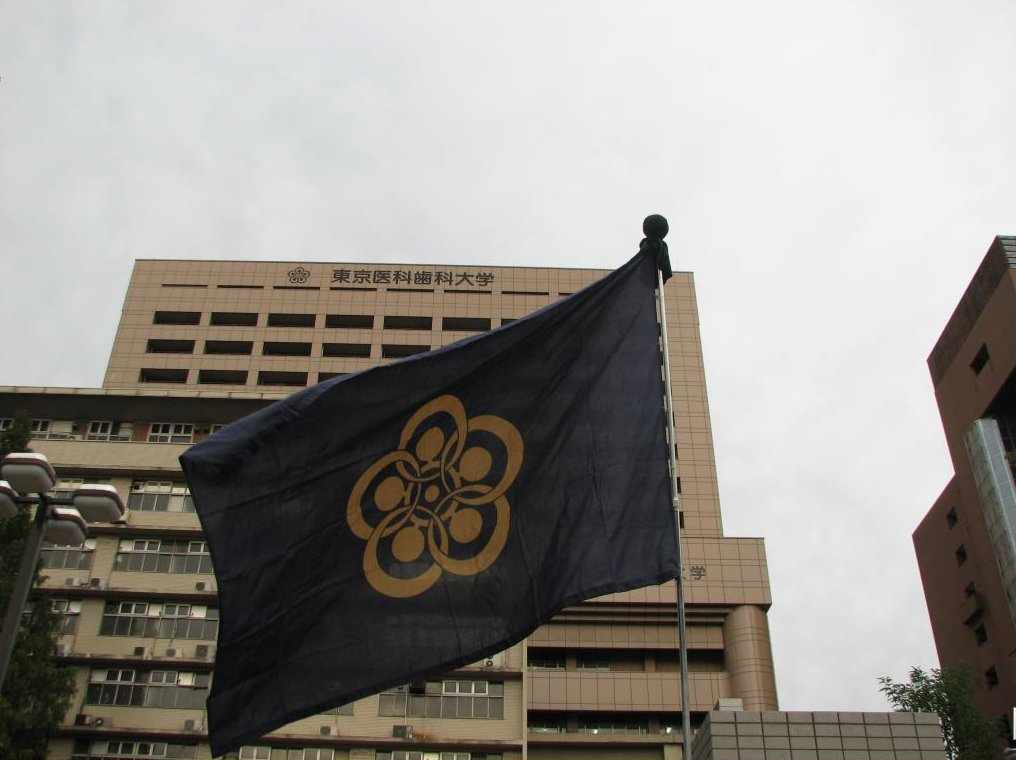
University flag

The university was founded under the title of Tokyo National School of Dentistry (東京高等歯科医学校, Tōkyō kōtō shikai gakkō) as the first national school of dentistry in Japan on October 12, 1928. The school established medical school in 1944 as Tokyo Medical and Dental College. It was renamed to Tokyo Medical and Dental University and received university status in 1946. Separate Faculty of Medicine and Faculty of Dentistry were established in 1951, along with a research institute dedicated to materials, which was later expanded to the current Institute of Biomaterials and Bioengineering. In accordance with the National University Corporation Act, the school became a National University Corporation in 2004.

University rankings

Global – Overall
- QS World: =697 (2026)

Regional – Overall
- QS Asia: =177 (2025)

== Organization ==
Faculties and institutes of Tokyo Medical and Dental University:

=== Graduate Schools ===
- Graduate School of Medical and Dental Sciences
- Graduate School of Health Care Sciences

=== Faculties and Colleges ===
- Faculty of Medicine
  - School of Medicine (6-year)
  - School of Health Care Sciences (4-year)
    - Track of Nursing Science
    - Track of Medical Technology
- Faculty of Dentistry
  - School of Dentistry (6-year)
  - School of Oral Health Care Sciences (4-year)
    - Track of Oral Health Care Sciences
    - Track of Oral Health Engineering
- College of Liberal Arts and Sciences

=== Institutes and Research centers ===
- Institute of Biomaterials and Bioengineering
- Medical Research Institute

=== University Hospitals ===
- University Hospital (813 beds, 327 dental chair units)

Tokyo Medical and Dental University Hospital made a start on 1 October 2021 through the integration of the Medical Hospital and the Dental Hospital.

== International Exchange ==
Tokyo Medical and Dental University has over 300 international students, mainly from Asian countries. Inter-university agreements have been concluded with 13 universities and facilities, while faculty-level agreements have been concluded with 93 universities and facilities around the world. Since 2002 the university has had an agreement with Partners Harvard Medical International involving enhancement of TMDU's education programs. An exchange program between Faculty of Medicine and Imperial College London was launched in 2004.

== Campuses ==
=== Yushima Campus ===
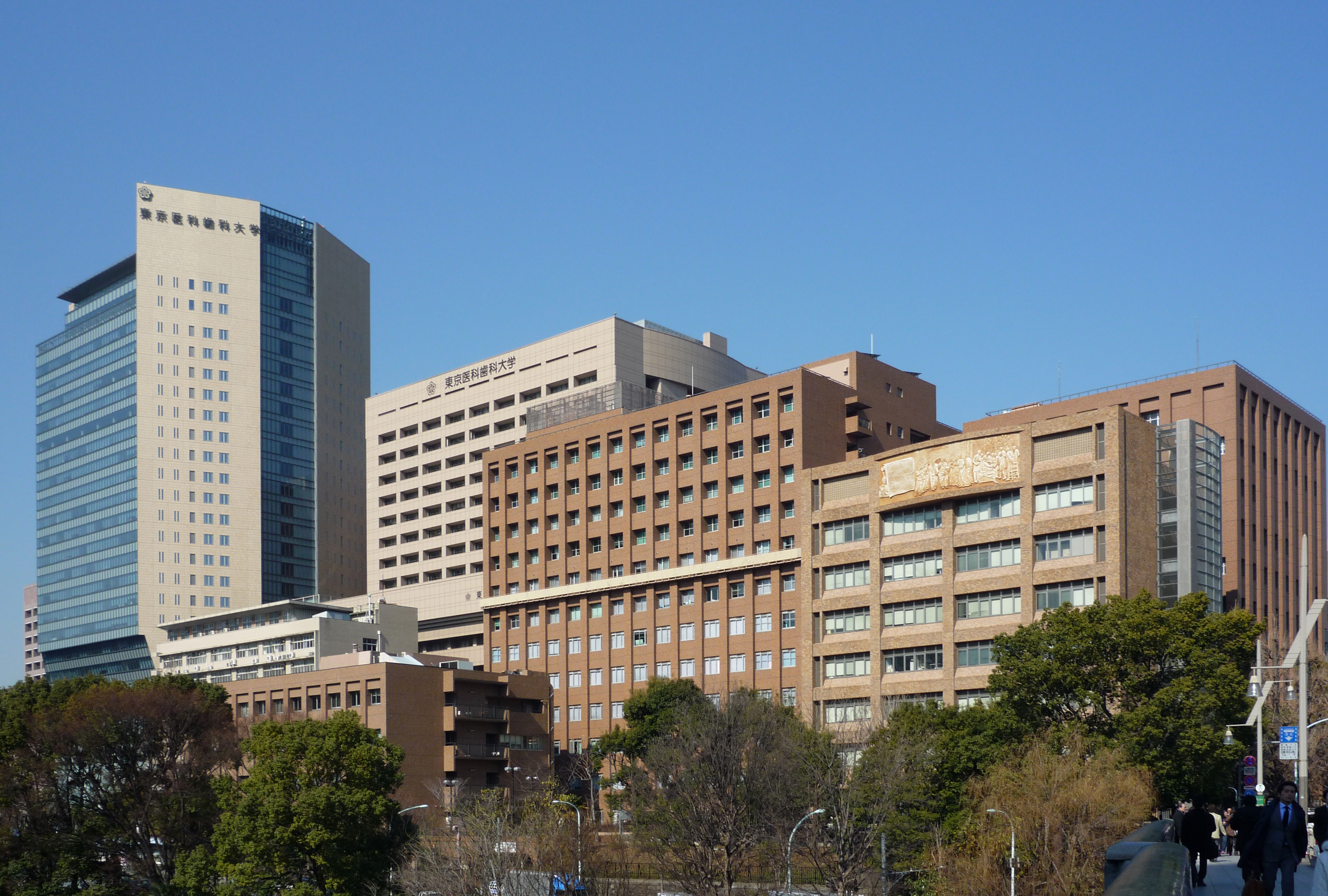
Headquarters of Tokyo Medical and Dental University in Bunkyō, Tokyo

Yushima (湯島, Yushima) Campus was the main campus located in Bunkyō, close to Ochanomizu Station, which contains the main university hospital buildings and research facilities including the 126m-tall M&D tower. The campus was close to Yushima Tenjin, from which the university plum blossom symbol (five petals) was derived.

=== Surugadai Campus ===
Surugadai (駿河台, Surugadai) Campus was also located close to Ochanomizu Station and houses the Medical Research Institute and Institute of Biomaterials and Bioengineering.

=== Konodai Campus ===
Konodai (国府台, Kōnodai) Campus houses the College of Liberal Arts and Sciences where undergraduate students start their university studies, and International House dormitory. This campus was located in Ichikawa City, Chiba Prefecture, about 40 minutes from Yushima Campus by train.
