= Tokyo Institute of Technology =

Former public university in Tokyo, Japan

Coordinates: 35°36′18″N 139°41′2″E

- 東京工業大学
- Motto: 時代を創る知・技・志・和の理工人 (Note: Rōmaji: Jidai o tsukuru chi, waza, kokorozashi, wa no rikōjin)
- Motto in English: Engineers of the Knowledge, Technology and Passion that Change our World.
- Type: Public university
- Active: 26 May 1881–1 October 2024
- Location: Meguro, Tokyo, Japan
- Campus: Urban/rural
- Colours: Royal Blue (DIC-641)
- Mascot: None
- Website: titech.ac.jp

The Tokyo Institute of Technology (東京工業大学) (Note: Officially abbreviated as Tokyo Tech, Tokodai; informally as TITech, TIT) was a public university in Meguro, Tokyo, Japan. It merged with Tokyo Medical and Dental University to form the Institute of Science Tokyo on 1 October 2024.

The Tokyo Institute of Technology was a Designated National University and a Top Type university of Top Global University Project designated by the Japanese government. Tokyo Tech's main campus was located at Ōokayama on the boundary of Meguro and Ota, with its main entrance facing the Ōokayama Station. Other campuses are located in Suzukakedai and Tamachi. Tokyo Tech was organised into 6 schools, within which there are over 40 departments and research centres. Tokyo Tech enrolled 4,734 undergraduates and 1,464 graduate students for 2015–2016.

== History ==
=== Foundation and early years (1881–1922) ===
Tokyo Institute of Technology was founded by the government of Japan as the Tokyo Vocational School on May 26, 1881, 14 years after the Meiji Restoration. To accomplish the quick catch-up to the West, the government expected this school to cultivate new modernized craftsmen and engineers. In 1890, it was renamed "Tokyo Technical School". In 1901, it changed name to "Tokyo Higher Technical School".

=== Great Kantō earthquake and World War II (1923–1945) ===
In early days, the school was located in Kuramae, the eastern area of the Greater Tokyo Area, where many craftsmens' workshops had been since the old Shōgun's era. The buildings in Kuramae campus were destroyed by the Great Kantō earthquake in 1923. In the following year, the Tokyo Higher Technical School moved from Kuramae to the present site in Ōokayama, a south suburb of the Greater Tokyo Area. In 1929, the school became Tokyo University of Engineering, later renamed to Tokyo Institute of Technology around 1946, gaining a status of national university, which allowed the university to award degrees. The university had the Research Laboratory of Building Materials in 1934, and five years later, the Research Laboratory of Resources Utilisation and the Research Laboratory of Precision Machinery were constructed. The Research Laboratory of Ceramic Industry was made in 1943, and one year before World War Two ended, the Research Laboratory of Fuel Science and the Research Laboratory of Electronics were founded.

=== Post-War Era (1946–present) ===
After World War II, the new education system was promulgated in 1949 with the National School Establishment Law, and Tokyo Institute of Technology was reorganized. Many three-year courses were turned into four-year courses with the start of the School of Engineering this year. The university started graduate programmes in engineering in 1953. In the following year, the six research laboratories were integrated and reorganised into four new labs: the Research Laboratory of Building Materials, the Research Laboratory of Resources Utilization, the Precision and Intelligence Laboratory and the Research Laboratory of Ceramic Industry, and the School of Engineering was renamed the School of Science and Engineering.

Throughout the post-war reconstruction of the 1950s, the high economic growth era of the 1960s, and the aggressive economic era marching to the Bubble Economy of the 1980s, TIT kept providing Japan its leading engineers, researchers, and business persons. Since April 2004, it has been semi-privatized into the National University Incorporation of Tokyo Institute of Technology under a new law which applied to all national universities.

Operating the world-class supercomputer Tsubame 2.0, and making a breakthrough in high-temperature superconductivity, Tokyo Tech was a major centre for supercomputing technology and condensed matter research in the world.

In 2011, it celebrated the 130th anniversary of its founding. In 2014, it joined the edX consortium and formed the Online Education Development Office (OEDO) to create MOOCS, which are hosted on the edX website.

In its 130 years, Tokyo Tech has provided scientific researchers, engineers and many social leaders, including Naoto Kan who was a former prime minister.

== Campuses ==
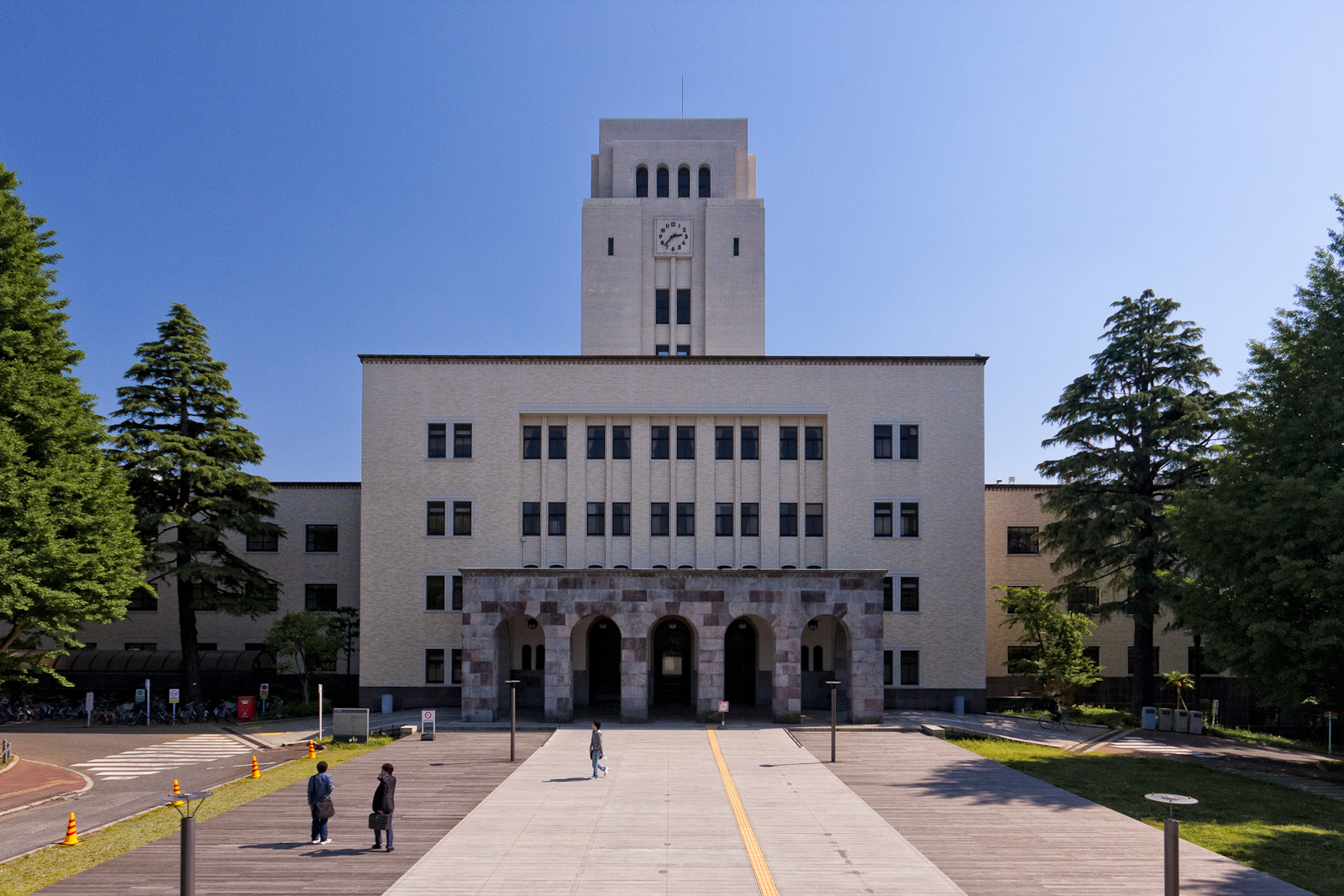
The main building of Ookayama Campus

Tokyo Tech has three campuses, Ōokayama campus in Ōokayama Meguro as the main campus, Tamachi campus in Shibaura and Suzukakedai campus, located in Nagatsuta, Midori-ku in Yokohama.

- Ōokayama campus
- Tamachi campus
- Suzukakedai campus

== Organization ==
=== Schools and departments ===
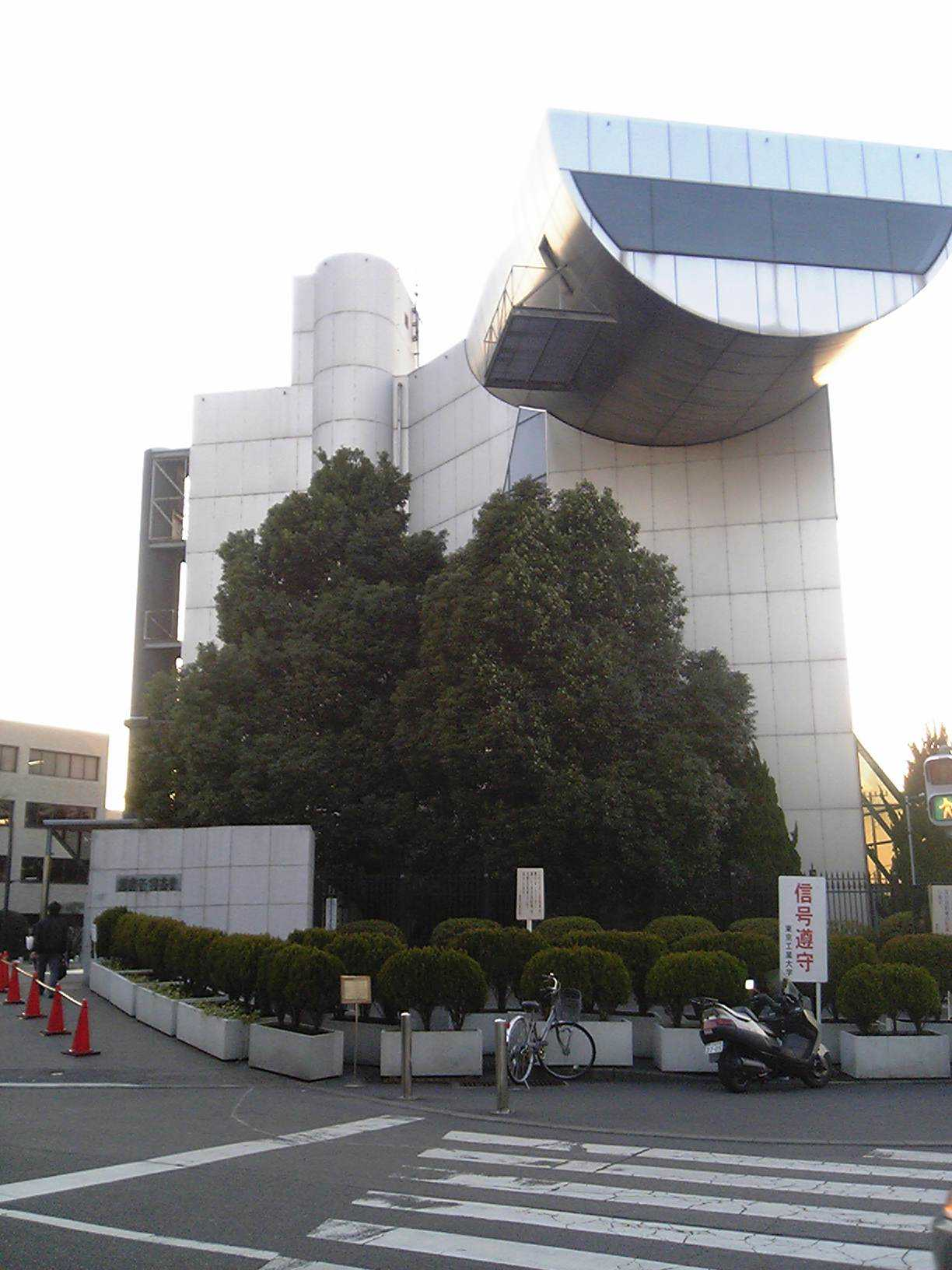
The Centennial Hall in Ōokayama campus, designed by the renowned architect Kazuo Shinohara, professor at Tokodai

Tokyo Tech comprises 6 schools, a number of departments and Institute for Liberal Arts.

- School of Science (ja)
  - Department of Mathematics
  - Department of Physics
  - Department of Chemistry
  - Department of Earth and Planetary Science
- School of Engineering (ja)
  - Department of Mechanical Engineering
  - Department of Systems and Control Engineering
  - Department of Electrical and Electric Engineering
  - Department of Information and Communication Engineering
  - Department of Industrial Engineering and Economics
- School of Life Science and Technology (ja)
  - Department of Life Science and Technology
- School of Computing (ja)
  - Department of Mathematical and Computing Science
  - Department of Computer Science
- School of Environment and Society (ja)
  - Department of Architecture and Building Engineering
  - Department of Civil and Environmental Engineering
  - Department of Transdisciplinary Science and Engineering
  - Department of Social and Human Sciences
  - Technology Innovation Management / Department of Innovation Science
- Institute for Liberal Arts

=== Research laboratories ===
- Chemical Resources Laboratory
- Precision and Intelligence Laboratory
- Materials and Structures Laboratory
- Research Laboratory for Nuclear Reactors
- Quantum Nano Electronics Research Centre
- Earth-Life Science Institute (ELSI)

=== Centers ===
==== Politics and social sciences ====
- Centre for Research in Advanced Financial Technology (Tokyo Institute of Technology)
- Precision and Intelligence Laboratory (Tokyo Institute of Technology)
- Solutions Research Laboratory
- Integrated Research Institute
- Global Edge Institute (Tokyo Institute of Technology)
- Productive Leader Incubation Platform
- Academy for Global Leadership
- Centre for Research and Development of Educational Technology (Tokyo Institute of Technology)
- Research Centre for Educational Facilities
- Creative Research Laboratory
- Research Centre for the Science of Institutional Management of Technology
- Collaboration Centre for Design and Manufacturing (CODAMA)
- Centre for Agent-Based Social Systems Sciences (Tokyo Institute of Technology)
- Foreign Language Research and Teaching Centre
- Centre for the Study of World Civilisations
- Asia-Africa Biology Research Centre
- Centre for CompView Research and Education
- Career Advancement Professional School
- Organization for Life Design and Engineering
- Centre for Liberal Arts

==== Engineering and computing ====
- Materials and Structure Laboratory (Tokyo Institute of Technology)
- Frontier Research Centre
- Imaging Science and Engineering Laboratory
- Global Scientific Information and Computing Centre
- Structural Engineering Research Centre
- Super-Mechano Systems R&D Centre
- Centre for Photonic Nano-Device Integrated Engineering
- Photovoltaics Research Center
- Inter-departmental organisation for Informatics

==== Chemistry and life sciences ====
- Chemical Resources Laboratory
- Research Centre for Carbon Recycling and Energy
- Centre for Biological Resources and Informatics
- International Research Centre of Macromolecular Science
- Bio-Frontier Research Centre
- Emerging Nanomaterial Research Centre
- Centre for Molecular Science and Technology
- The Osmotic Power Research Centre

==== Physics and astronomy ====
- Volcanic Fluid Research Centre (Tokyo Institute of Technology)
- Research Laboratory for Nuclear Reactors (Tokyo Institute of Technology)
- Research Centre for Low Temperature Physics
- Quantum Nanoelectronics Research Centre
- Centre for Urban Earthquake Engineering
- Research Centre for Nanometer-Scale Quantum Physics
- Research Centre for the Evolving Earth and Planets
- Centre for Research into Innovative Nuclear Energy Systems

=== Other facilities ===
- Asia-Oceania Top University League on Engineering
- Tokyo Tech Archive Initiative
- Health Service Centres
- TITECH Earth Database Centre
- Tokyo Tech Front
- International Student Centre
- Inter-departmental Organization for Environment and Energy
- ICE Cube Centre

== Academics ==
=== Libraries ===
The main library was the Tokyo Institute of Technology Library in Ookayama. It was the home of Japan's largest science and technology library. The library was founded in 1882, and it lost nearly 28,000 books during the Great Kantō earthquake in 1923. Moved to Ookayama in 1936, it has been the national science and technology library of Japan.

1,200 students and staff visit the library each day.
It has 674,000 books and 2,500 journals, including 1,600 foreign academic journals; the number of international research collections was the largest in Japan. It provides around 7,000 registered electronic journals each year. The library was therefore recognised for the outstanding national and international importance and awarded 'Centre of foreign journals' by the government of Japan. Renewal construction of the library was completed in July 2011.

=== International graduate programmes ===
Tokyo Tech runs intensive programmes for obtaining master degree or PhD. Named the Tokyo Tech's International Graduate Program, the programmes are targeted at international students of high academic potential who are not Japanese speakers. Lectures and seminars are given in English mainly by Tokyo Tech's faculty members. Programme starting dates are October or April. Public fundings for these courses are also available; those students who have academic excellence may apply for scholarships from the Ministry of Education, Culture, Sports, Science and Technology of Japan.

== Academic rankings ==
University rankings
Global
THE	General	195
QS	General	85
ARWU	Research	151–200

Regional
THE Asia (Asia version)	General	=32
QS Asia (Asia version)	General	30
ARWU Asia	Research	10–18

National

Program rankings
Natural Sciences & Technology

Engineering
Kawaijuku National	General	2~3
QS World	General	19

MATERIALS SCIENCE
T.Reuters National	Research	5
T.Reuters World	Research	24

PHYSICS
T.Reuters National	Research	5
T.Reuters World	Research	31

CHEMISTRY
T.Reuters National	Research	5
T.Reuters World	Research	22

MATHEMATICS
ARWU National	Research	3
ARWU World	Research	77–100
- * T. Reuters World rankings include non-educational institutions

=== General rankings ===
Tokyo Tech has been ranked 2nd among the Japanese universities according to The Times Higher Education World University Rankings 2021. Tokyo Tech has also ranked 3rd among the best Japanese universities according to QS World University Rankings 2021. Tokyo Tech has also been ranked 2nd (national) in 2011 in the field of Engineering "Entrance score ranking of Japanese universities-Department of Engineering" by Score-navi. In another ranking, Japanese prep school Kawaijuku ranked Tokyo Tech as the 4th best (overall), 2-3rd best in former semester and 1st in latter semester (Department of Engineering) university in Japan (2012).

According to QS World University Rankings, Tokyo Tech was ranked 3rd in Japan and internationally ranked 20th in the field of Engineering and Technology, and 51st in Natural science in 2011. The university was ranked 31st worldwide according to Global University ranking and 57th in 2011 according to QS World University Rankings, It was also ranked 31st worldwide according to the Global University Ranking in 2009.

=== Research performance ===
Tokyo Tech was one of the top research institutions in natural sciences and technology in Japan. According to Thomson Reuters, its research excellence (Pure science only for this information) was especially distinctive in Materials Science (5th in Japan, 24th in the world), Physics (5th in Japan, 31st in the world), and Chemistry (5th in Japan, 22nd in the world).

Weekly Diamond also reported that Tokyo Tech has the highest research standard in Japan in terms of research fundings per researchers in COE Program. In the same article, it's also ranked 8th in terms of the quality of education by GP funds per student.

In addition, according to the September 2012 survey by QS World University Rankings about the general standards in Engineering and Technology field, Tokyo Tech was placed 19th (world), 2nd (national).

The Tsubame 2.0, which was a large-scale supercomputer in Tokyo Tech, was ranked 5th of the world best-performed computer. 1st in the world as university's owned one, this supercomputer was used for simulation related to the complex systems such as the dynamics of planets or financial systems.

As Tokyo Tech has been emphasizing on 'practical' research, Tokyo Tech got the 2nd place at the number of patents accepted (284) during 2009 among Japanese Universities.

=== Alumni rankings ===
The Alumni of Tokyo Tech have achieved significant success across Japanese industries.

According to (Truly Strong Universities -TSU), this university has been acquiring the highest , ranked 1st , employment rate within Japan.

According to the Weekly Economist's 2010 rankings and the PRESIDENT's article on 2006/10/16, graduates from Tokyo Tech have the 2nd best employment rate in 400 major companies, and the average graduate salary was the 9th best in Japan. École des Mines de Paris ranks Tokyo Tech as 92nd in the world in 2011 in terms of the number of alumni listed among CEOs in the 500 largest worldwide companies. Also, according to the article of The New York Times- Universities with the most employable students ranking 2012, Tokyo Tech ranked 14th place in the world (2nd in Asia, 1st in Japan).

=== Popularity and selectivity ===
Tokyo Tech was one of the most selective universities in Japan. Its entrance examinations are usually considered one of the most difficult in Japan.

== Evaluation from Business World ==
The university ranking of the ratio of "president and chief executive officer of listed company"
	Ranking
All universities in Japan	7th out of all the 744 universities which existed as of 2006
Source	2006 Survey by Weekly Diamond 〈ja〉 on the ranking of the universities which produced the high ratio of the graduates who hold the position of "president and chief executive officer of listed company" to all the graduates of each university

The university ranking according to the ratio of the number of the officers & managers produced by each university to the number of graduates
	Ranking
All universities in Japan	39th out of all the 778 universities which existed as of 2010
Source	2010 Survey by Weekly Economist 〈ja〉 on the ranking of universities according to the ratio of the number of the officers & managers produced by each university to the number of graduates

Ranking of the evaluation by Personnel Departments of Leading Companies in Japan
	Ranking
Kantō & Kōshin'etsu region	7th out of 262 universities which existed in Kantō & Kōshin'etsu region as of 2020
Japan	7th (out of 781 universities which existed in Japan as of 2020)
Source	2020 Nikkei Survey to all listed (3,714) and leading unlisted (1,100), totally 4,814 companies

== Wildlife ==
As of 2009, there was a large population of rose-ringed parakeets residing at the main campus of the Tokyo Institute of Technology in Ookayama.

== Gallery ==
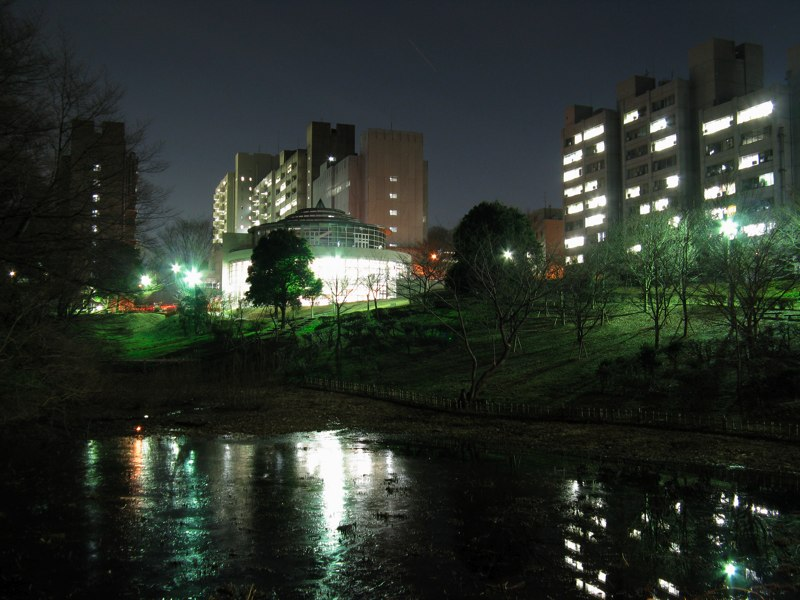
Suzukakedai campus at night

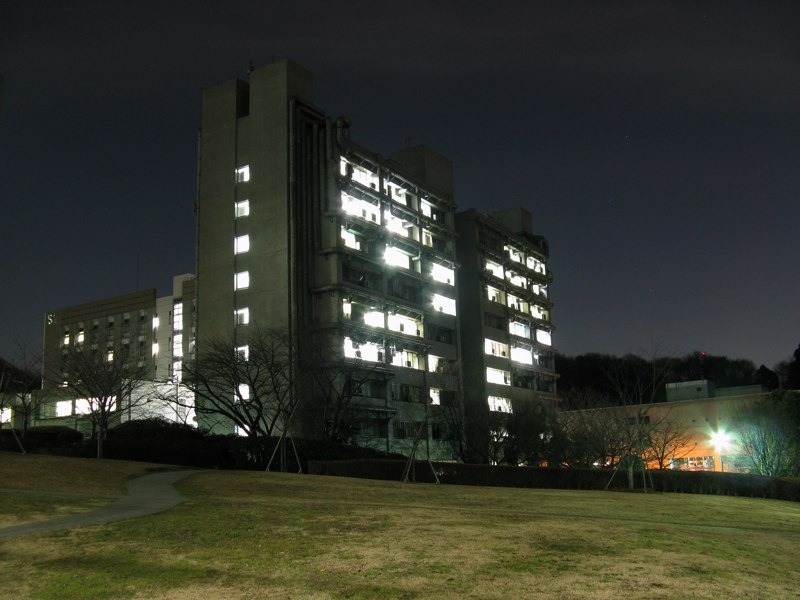
Suzukakedai campus at night

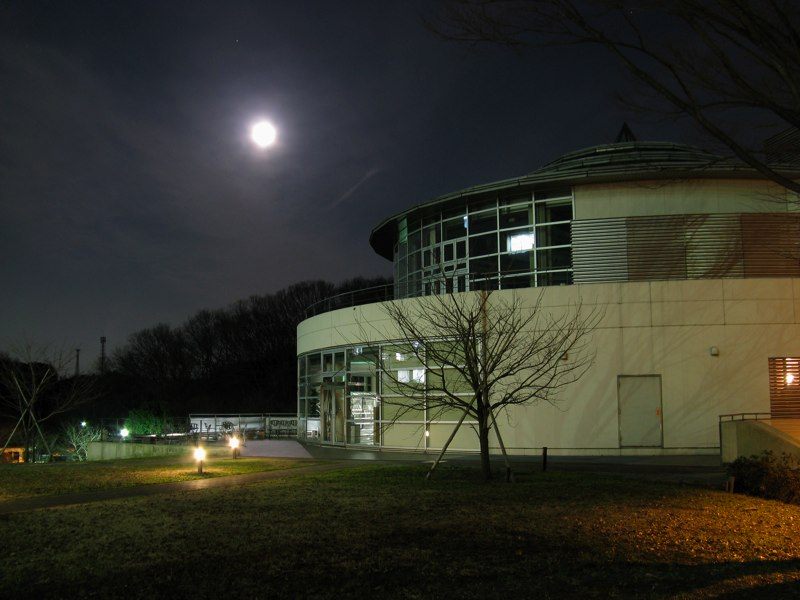
Suzukakedai campus at night

== See also ==
- Ken Mogi
- Research Institutes at Tokyo Tech
- Supercomputing in Japan
