= NEC SX-8 =

Supercomputer built by NEC Corporation

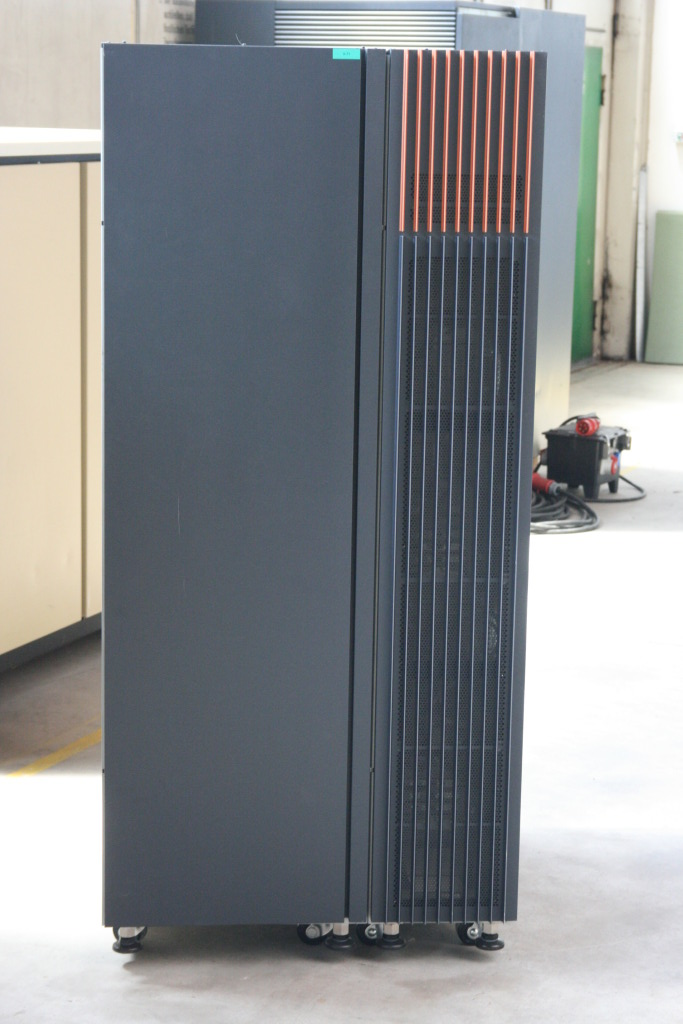
Front view of SX-8 frame

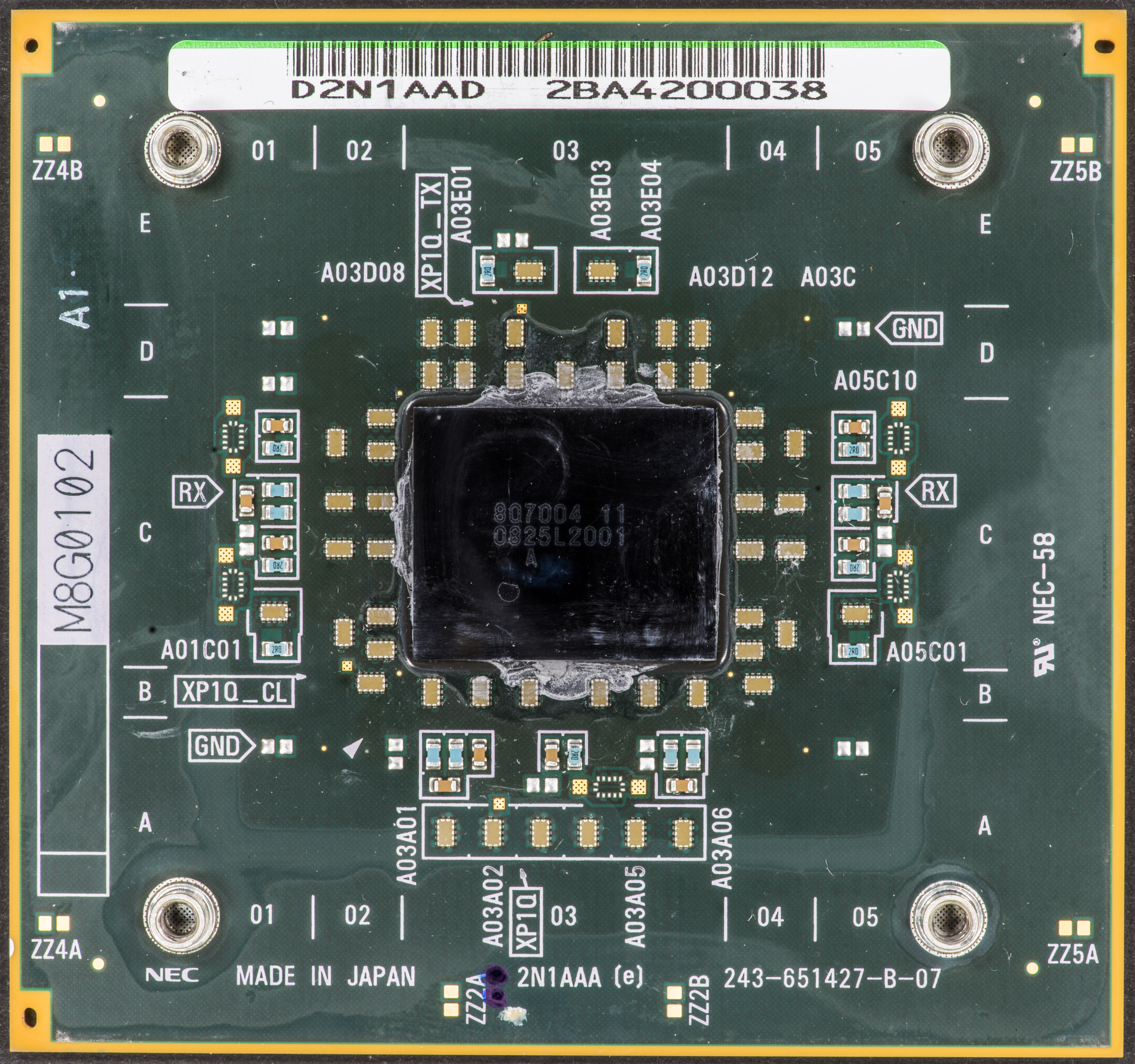
NEC SX-8 processor

The SX-8 is a supercomputer built by NEC Corporation. The SX-8 Series implements an eight-way SMP system in a compact node module and uses an enhanced version of the single chip vector processor that was introduced with the SX-6. The NEC SX-8 processors run at 2 GHz for vectors and 1 GHz for scalar operations. The SX-8 CPU operates at 16 GFLOPS and can address up to 128 GB of memory. Up to 8 CPUs may be used in a single node, and a complete system may have up to 512 nodes. The SX-8 series ranges from the single-CPU SX-8b system to the SX-8/4096M512, with 512 nodes, 4,096 CPUs, and a peak performance of 65 TFLOPS. There is up to 512 GB/s bandwidth per node (64 GB/s per processor). The SX-8 runs SUPER-UX, a Unix-like operating system developed by NEC.

The first production SX-8 was installed at the UK Met Office in early 2005. In October 2006, an upgraded SX-8 was announced, the SX-8R. The NEC SX-8R processors run at 2.2 GHz for vectors and 1.1 GHz for scalar operations. The SX-8R can process double the number of vector operations per clock compared to the SX-8. The SX-8R CPU has a peak vector performance 35.2 GFLOPS (10% frequency increase and double the number of vector operations) and can address up to 256 GB of memory in a single node (up from 128 GB).

The French national meteorological service, Météo-France, rents a SX-8R for 3.7 million euros a year.

== NEC published product highlights ==
- 16 GFLOPS peak vector performance, with eight operations per clock running at 2 GHz or 0.5 ns (1 GHz for scalar)
- 88 million transistors per CPU, 1.0 V, 8,210 pins (1,923 signal pins)
- Up to 8 CPUs per node, manufactured in 90 nm Cu technology, 9 copper layers, bare chip packaging
- Up to 16 GB of memory per CPU, 128 GB in a single node
- Up to 512 GB/s bandwidth per node, 64 GB/s per CPU
- IXS Super-Switch between nodes, up to 512 nodes supported, 32 GB/s per node (16 GB/s for each direction)
- Air cooled
- Runs SUPER-UX, System V port, 4.3 BSD with enhancements for multinode systems; ease of use; support for new languages and standards; and operation improvements

== See also ==
- SX architecture
