= NEC SX-9 =

Supercomputer built by NEC Corporation

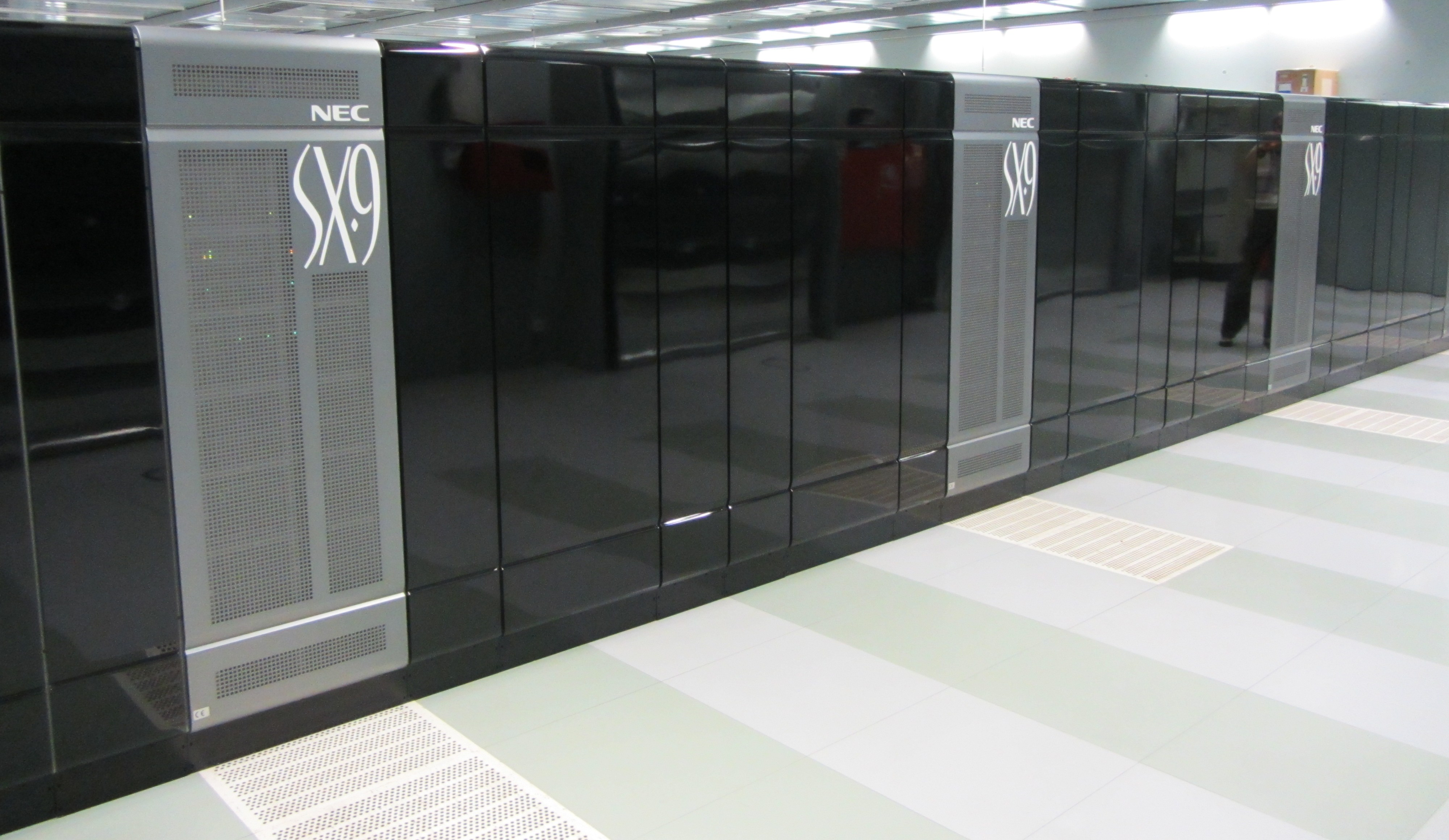
NEC SX-9, right side

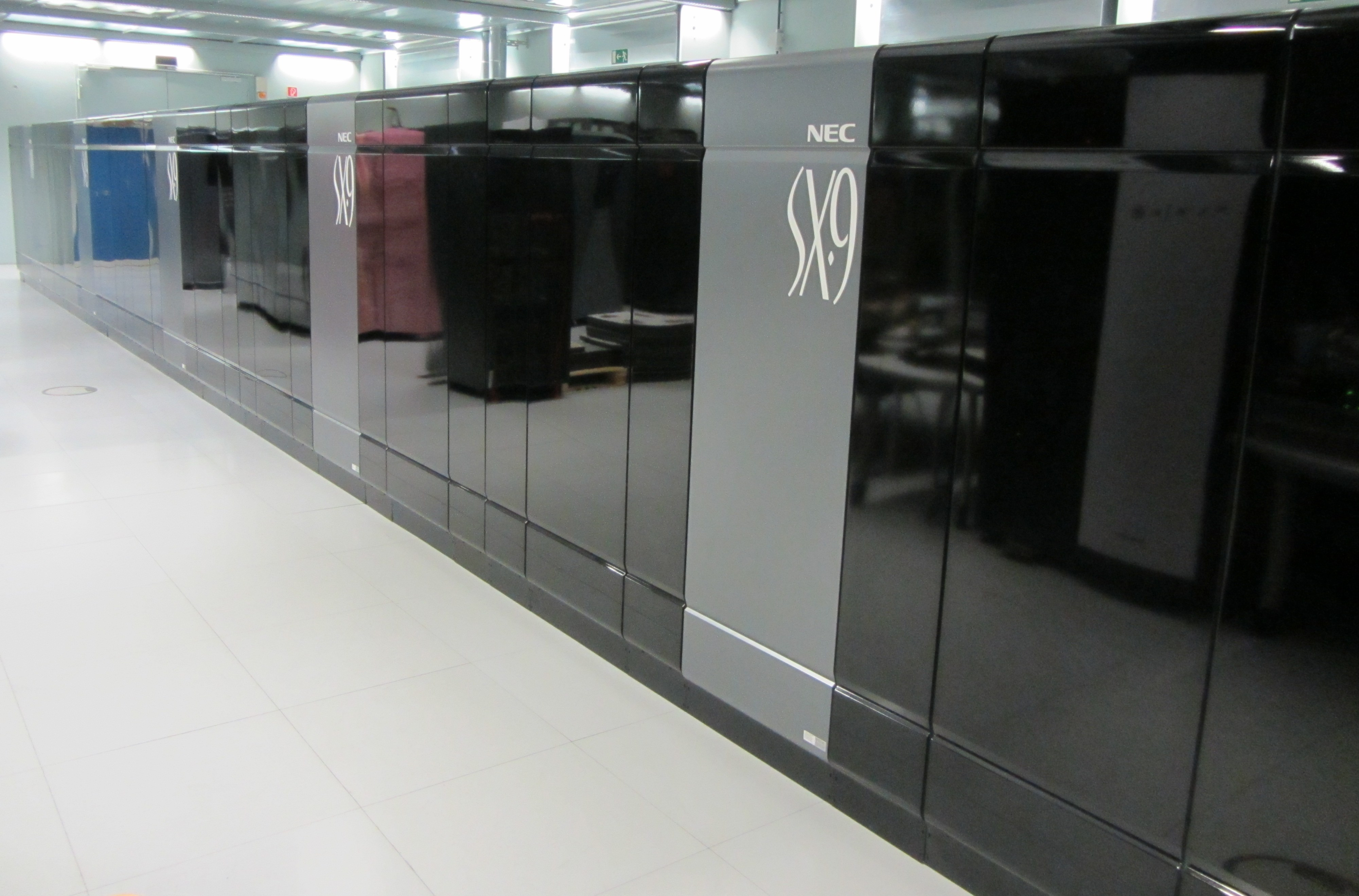
NEC SX-9, left side

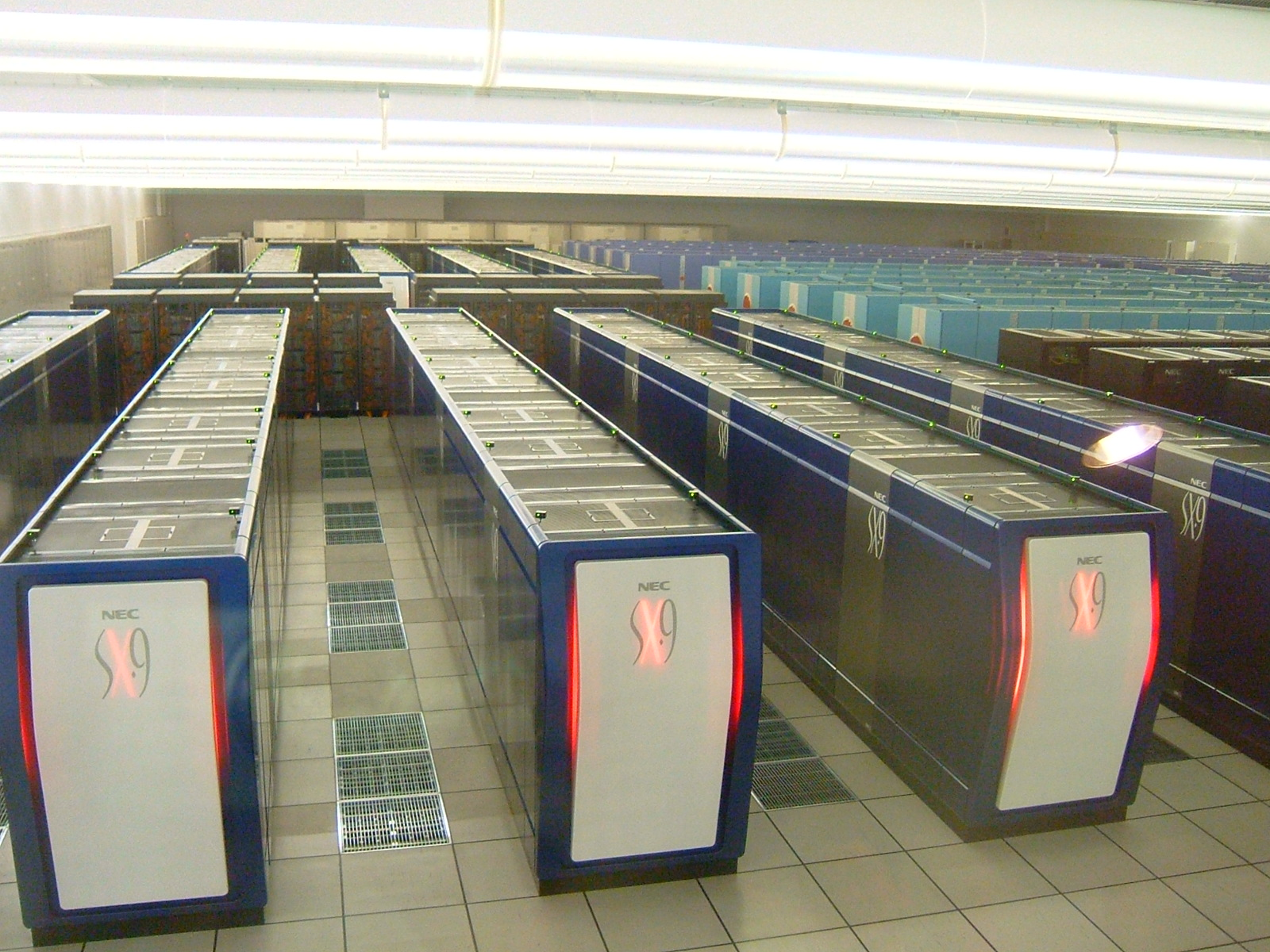
NEC SX-9 Earth Simulator

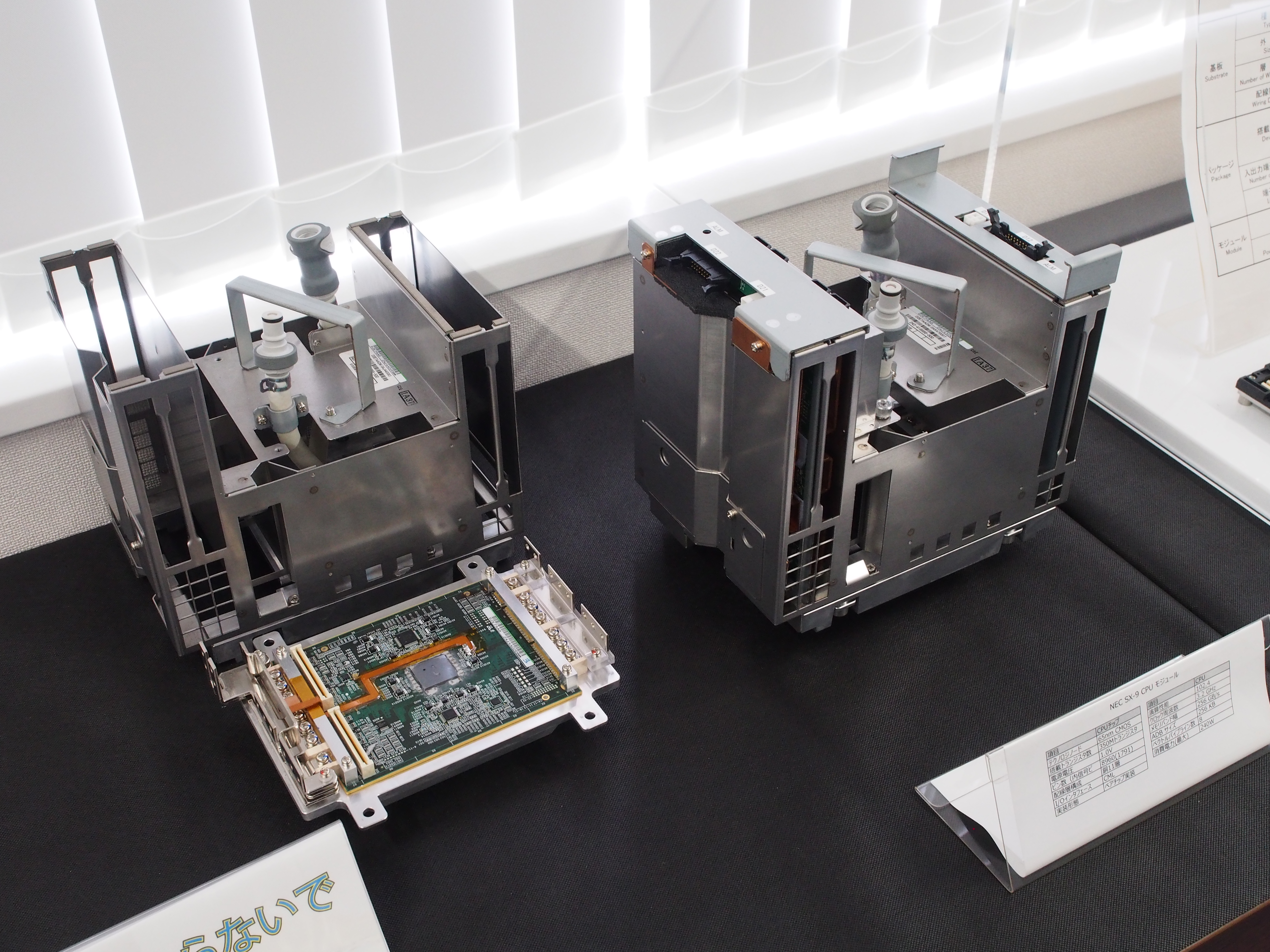
NEC SX-9 CPU modules

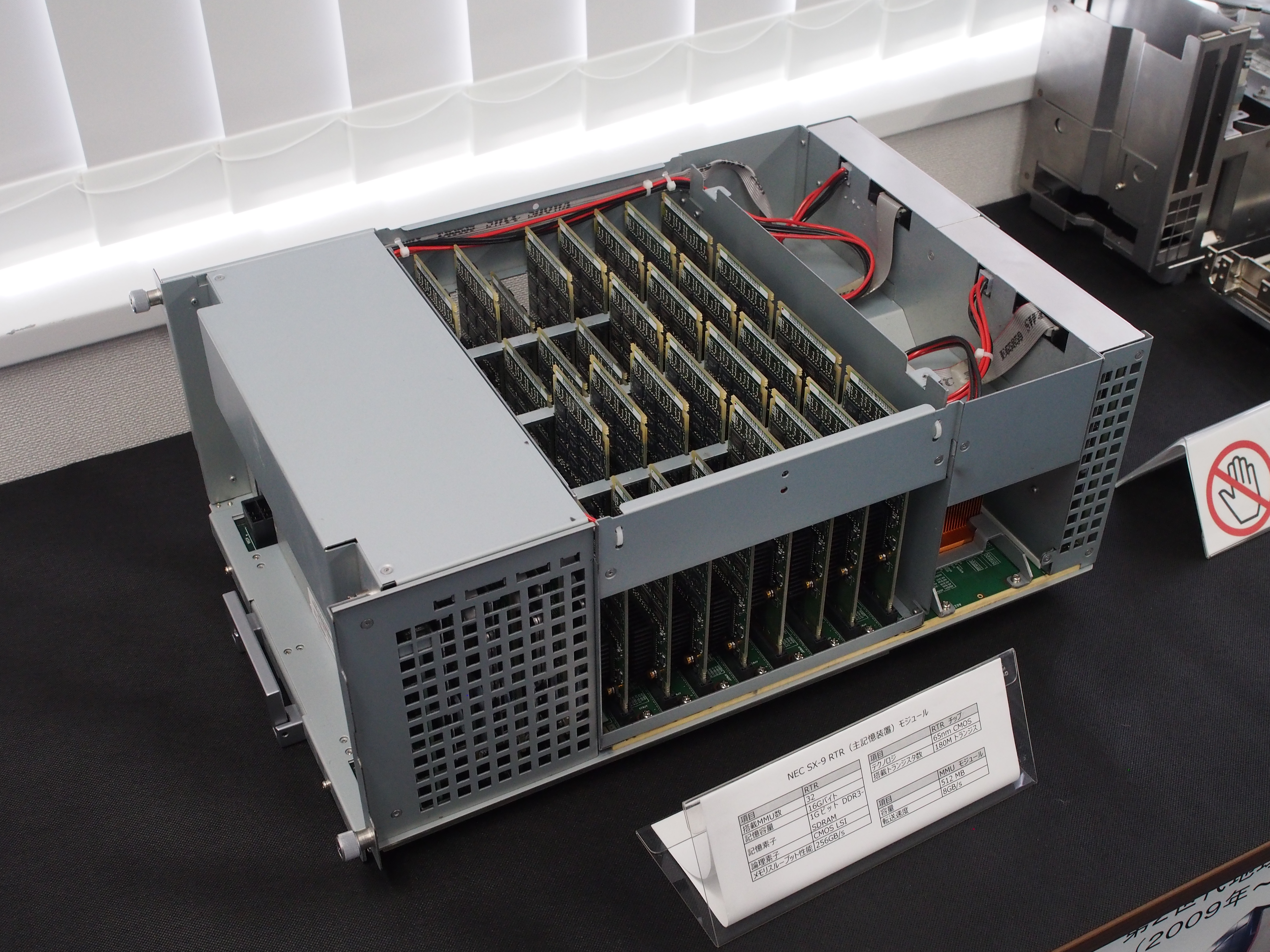
NEC SX-9 memory module

The SX-9 is a NEC SX supercomputer built by NEC Corporation. The SX-9 Series implements an SMP system in a compact node module and uses an enhanced version of the single chip vector processor that was introduced with the SX-6. The NEC SX-9 processors run at 3.2 GHz, with eight-way replicated vector pipes, each having two multiply units and two addition units; this results in a peak vector performance of 102.4 gigaFLOPS. For non-vectorized code, there is a scalar processor that runs at half the speed of the vector unit, i.e. 1.6 GHz. Up to 16 CPUs and 1 terabyte of memory may be used in a single node. Each node is packaged in an air-cooled cabinet, similar in size to a standard 42U computer rack. The SX-9 series ranges from the single-node SX-9/B system with 4 CPUs to the maximum expansion stage with 512 nodes, 8,192 CPUs, and 970 TFLOPS peak performance. There is up to 4 TB/s shared memory bandwidth per node and 2×128 GB/s node interconnect bandwidth. The operating system is NEC's SUPER-UX, a Unix-like OS.

The SX-9 had the world's fastest vector CPU core. A fully equipped system with 512 nodes would have been the world's fastest supercomputer at the time of release in the first quarter of 2008, with a performance of 819 TFLOPS. The SX-9 was discontinued in 2015.

The German national meteorological service (DWD) operated two independent SX-9 clusters, with 976 processors, 31,232 GB of RAM and 98 TFLOPS performance in total.

== NEC Published Product Highlights ==
- 1.6 TFLOPS max. peak performance per node
- 350 million transistors per CPU, 1.0 V, 8,960 pins (1,791 signal pins)
- Up to 16 CPUs per node, manufactured in 65 nm CMOS cu technology, 11 copper layers
- Up to 64 GB of memory per CPU, 1 TB in a single node
- Up to 4 TB/s bandwidth per node, 256 GB/s per CPU
- IXS Super-Switch between nodes, up to 512 nodes supported, 256 GB/s per node (128 GB/s for each direction)
- 50% less power consumption compared to the NEC SX-8R

== See also ==
- SUPER-UX
- SX architecture
