= NEC SX-ACE =

The SX-ACE is a vector supercomputer based on the NEC SX series by NEC Corporation. It features NEC's first multi-core System on a Chip vector processor design, with four cores. The SX-ACE runs at 1 GHz, has peak performance of 64 GFLOPS per core, and has 64 gigabytes per second of memory bandwidth per core. Four cores make up a shared-memory node, and 64 nodes can fit in a rack for a total performance of 16 TFLOPS per rack. The SX-ACE was released in 2013. NEC released the successor, the SX-Aurora TSUBASA in 2017. It is used by Earth Simulator 3.

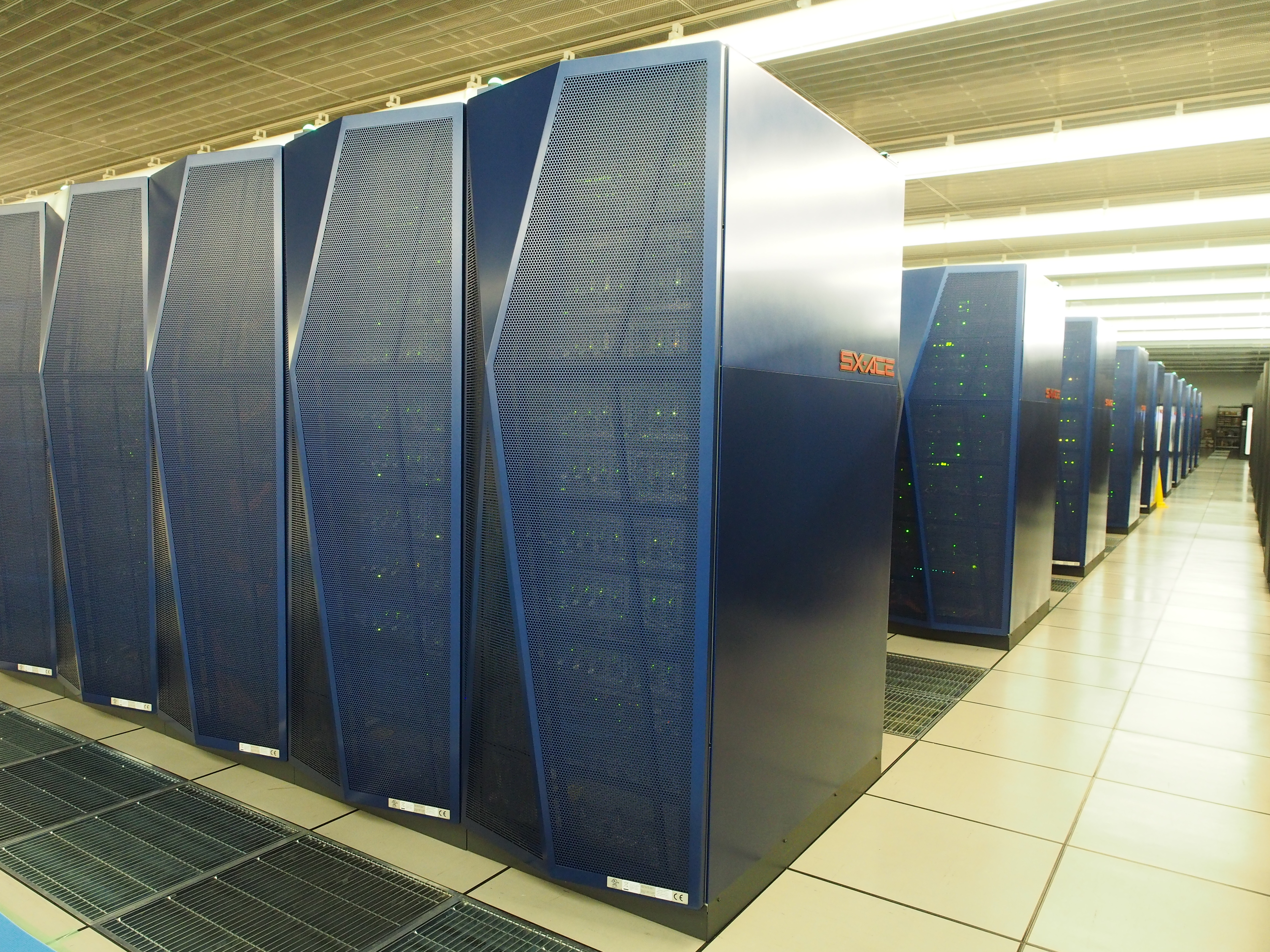

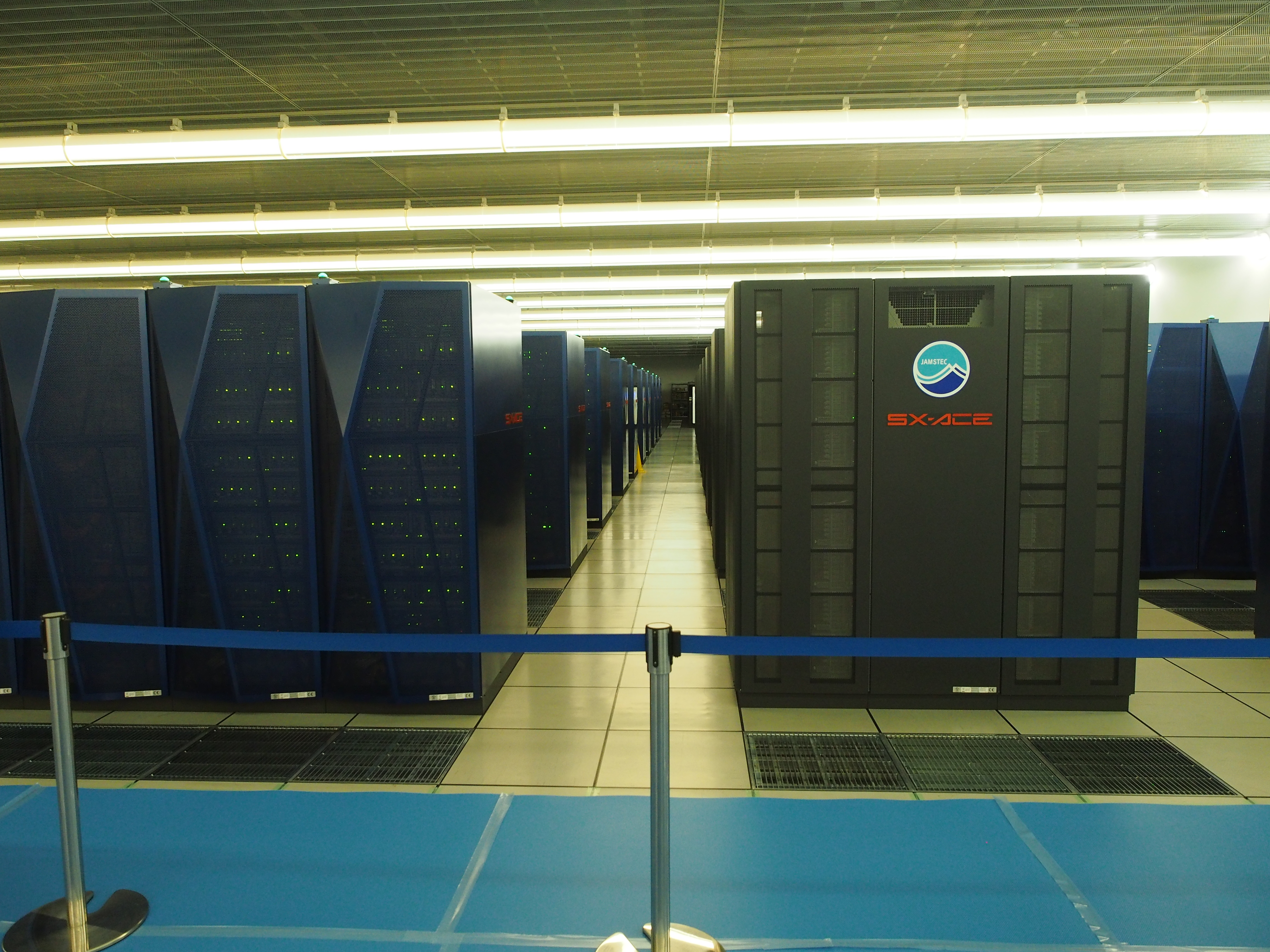

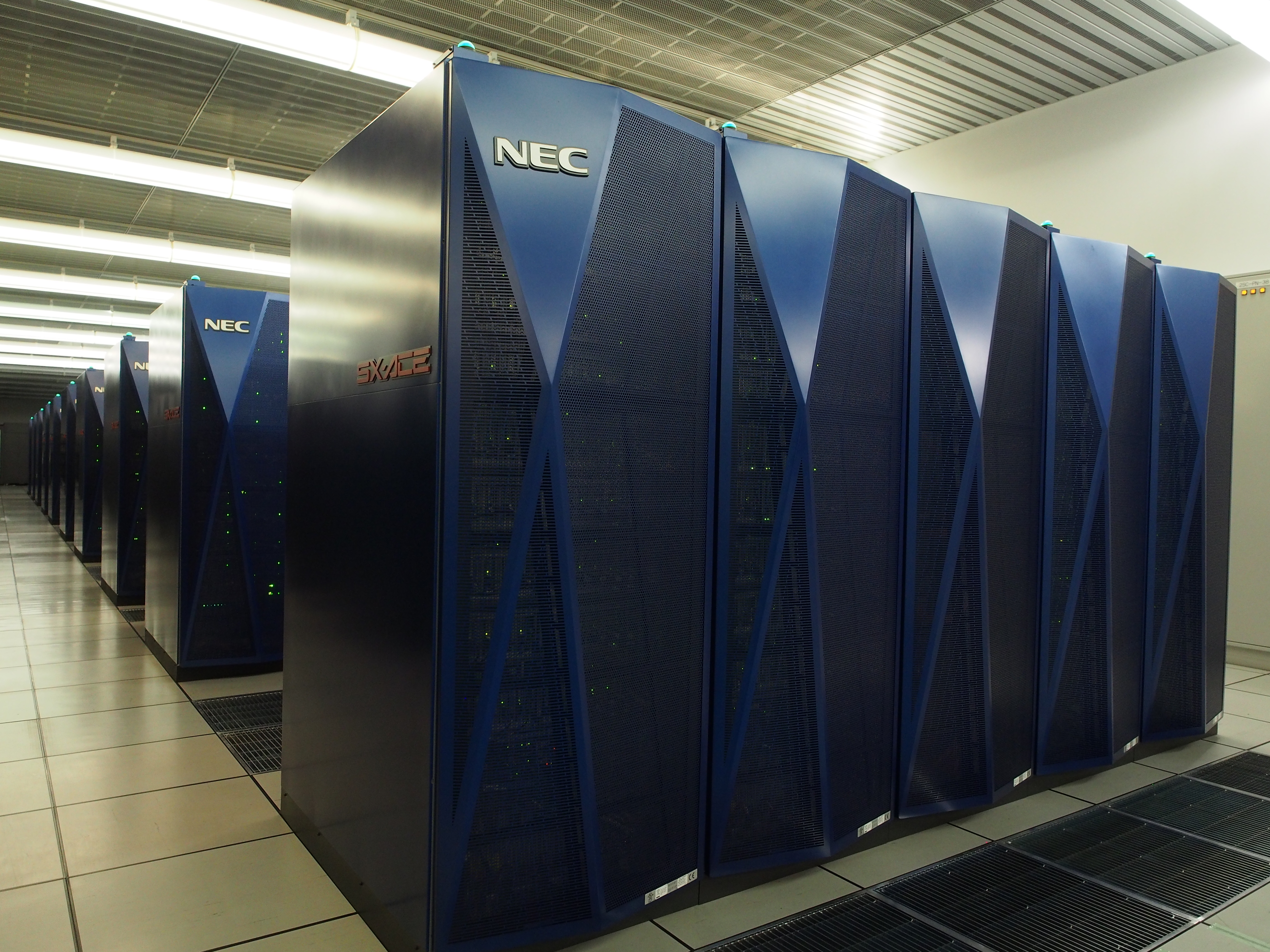

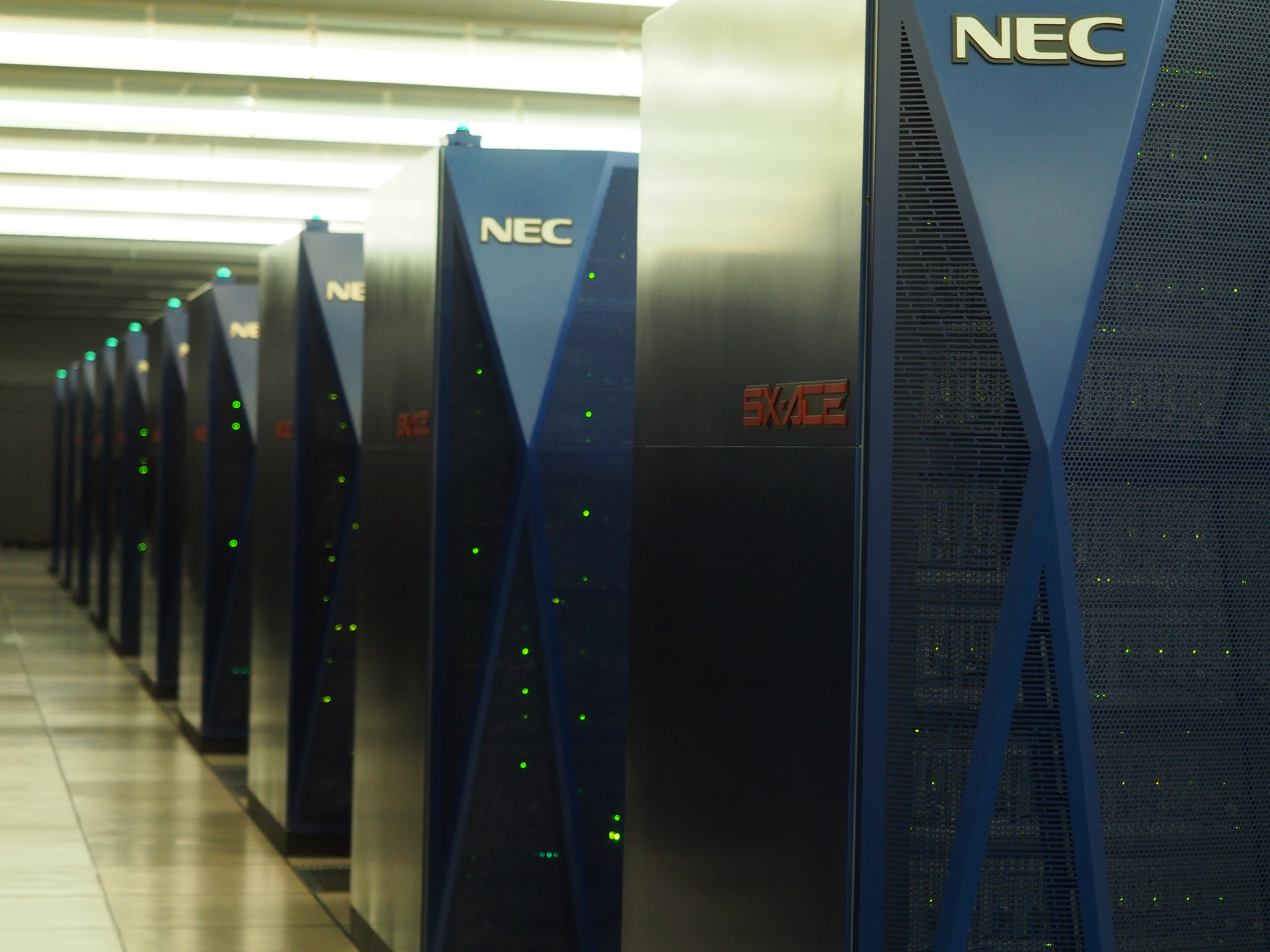

== See also ==
- SUPER-UX
- SX architecture
