= NEC SX =

Series of supercomputers by NEC

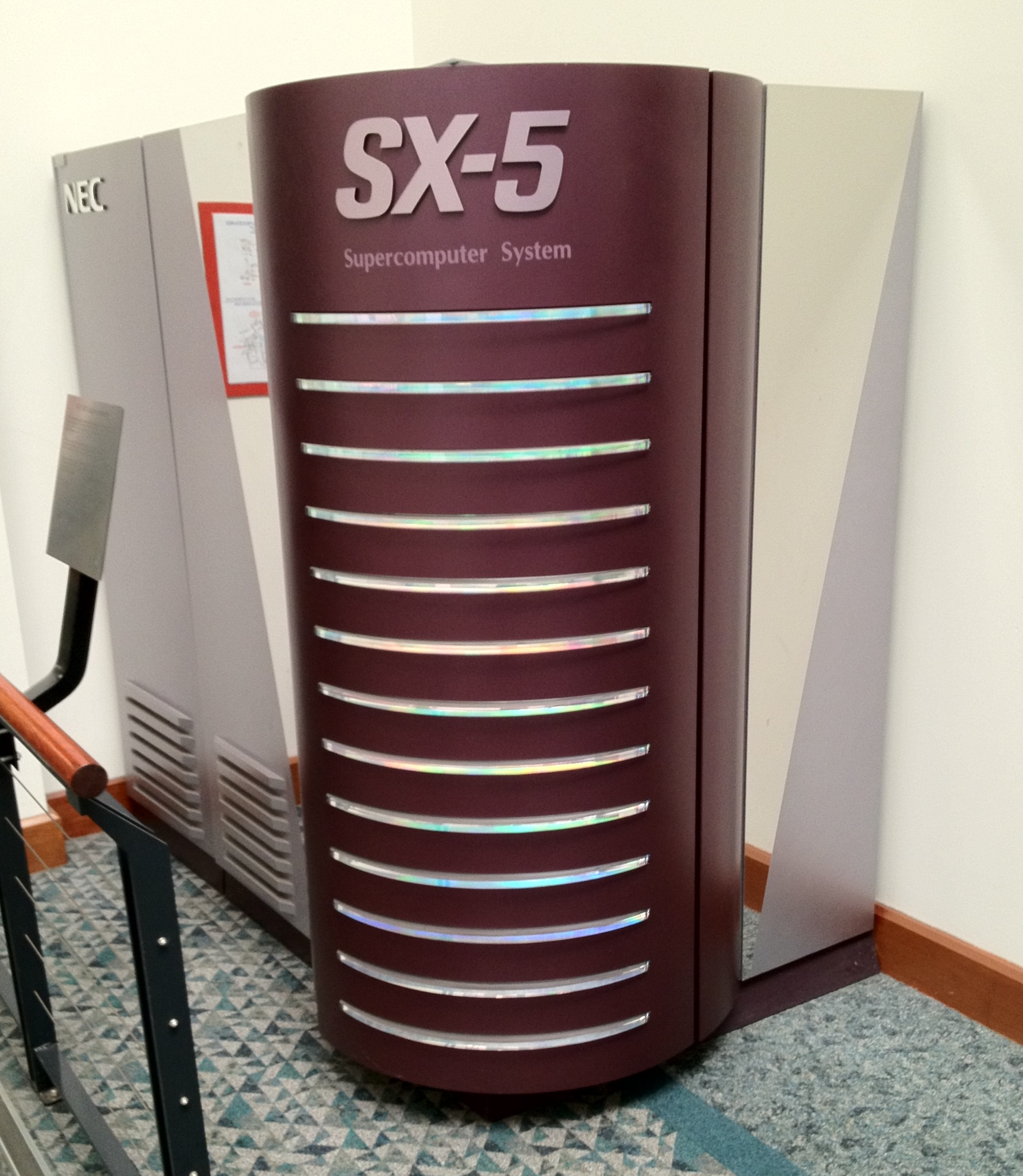
An SX-5 on display at the Australian Technology Park

NEC SX describes a series of vector supercomputers designed, manufactured, and marketed by NEC. This computer series is notable for providing the first computer to exceed 1 gigaflop, as well as the fastest supercomputer in the world between 1992–1993, and 2002–2004. The current model, as of 2018, is the SX-Aurora TSUBASA.

== History ==
The first models, the SX-1 and SX-2, were announced in April 1983, and released in 1985. The SX-2 was the first computer to exceed 1 GigaFLOPS (FLOPS). The SX-1 and SX-1E were less powerful models offered by NEC.

The SX-3 was announced in 1989, and shipped in 1990. The SX-3 allows parallel computing using both SIMD and MIMD. It also switched from the ACOS-4 based SX-OS, to the AT&T System V UNIX-based SUPER-UX operating system. In 1992 an improved variant, the SX-3R, was announced. A SX-3/44 variant was the fastest computer in the world between 1992-1993 on the TOP500 list. It had LSI integrated circuits with 20,000 gates per IC with a per-gate delay time of 70 picoseconds, could house 4 arithmetic processors with up to 4 sharing the same main memory, and up to several processors to achieve up to 22 GFLOPS of performance, with 1.37 GFLOPS of performance with a single processor. 100 LSI ICs were housed in a single multi chip module to achieve 2 million gates per module. The modules were watercooled.

The SX-4 series was announced in 1994, and first shipped in 1995. The SX-4 was the first supercomputer to achieve 1 TeraFLOPS (TFLOPS) performance. Since the SX-4, SX series supercomputers are constructed in a doubly parallel manner. A number of central processing units (CPUs) are arranged into a parallel vector processing node. These nodes are then installed in a regular SMP arrangement.

The SX-5 was announced and shipped in 1998, with the SX-6 following in 2001, and the SX-7 in 2002. Starting in 2001, Cray marketed the SX-5 and SX-6 exclusively in the US, and non-exclusively elsewhere for a short time.

The Earth Simulator, built from SX-6 nodes, was the fastest supercomputer from June 2002 to June 2004 on the LINPACK benchmark, achieving 35.86 TFLOPS. The SX-9 was introduced in 2007 and discontinued in 2015.

Tadashi Watanabe has been NEC's lead designer for the majority of SX supercomputer systems. For this work he received the Eckert–Mauchly Award in 1998 and the Seymour Cray Computer Engineering Award in 2006.

== Hardware ==
=== CPU architecture ===
The NEC SX Vector Engine (VE) is a vector processor, and each VE core has a Scalar Processing Unit (SPU) with 64 scalar registers of 64 bits, and a Vector Processing Unit (VPU) with 64 vector registers (of up to 256 bits in the SX-Aurora TSUBASA). The SPU implements in hardware the IEEE 754's quadruple-precision floating-point format, and every instruction is 64-bit long.

=== SX systems ===
Each system has multiple models, and the following table lists the most powerful variant of each system. Further certain systems have revisions, identified by a letter suffix.

Single node SX systems
System	Introduction	Max. CPUs	Peak CPU double precision GFLOPS	Peak system GFLOPS	Max. main memory	System memory B/W (GB/s)	Memory B/W per CPU (GB/s)
SX-1E	1983	1		0.325	128 MB		
SX-1	1983	1		0.570 / 0.650	256 MB		
SX-2	1983	1	1.3	1.3	256 MB	11	11
SX-3	1990	4	5.5	22	2 GB	44	22
SX-3R	1992						
SX-4	1994	32	2	64	16 GB	512	16
SX-5	1998	16	8	128	128 GB	1024	64
SX-6	2001	8	8	64	64 GB	256	32
SX-6i	2001	1			8 GB		
SX-7	2002	32	8.83	282	256 GB	1129	35.3
SX-8	2004	8	16	128	128 GB	512	64
SX-8i	2005				32 GB		
SX-8R	2006	8	35.2	281.6	256 GB	563.2	70.4
SX-9	2007	16	102.4	1638	1 TB	4096	256
SX-ACE	2013	1	256	256	1 TB	256	256
SX-Aurora TSUBASA	2017	8	2450	19600	8×48GB	8×1200	1200
SX-Aurora TSUBASA Type 20	2021	8	3070	24560	8×48GB	8×1530	1530

Multi-node SX systems
	SX-4	SX-4A	SX-5	SX-6	SX-8	SX-8R	SX-9	SX-ACE
Max. nodes	16	16	32	128	512	512	512	512
Max. CPUs	512	256	512	1,024	4,096	4,096	8,192	512
Peak TFLOPS	1	0.5	4	8	65	140.8	839	131
Max. main memory	256 GB	512 GB	4 TB	8 TB	64 TB	128 TB	512 TB	32 TB
Total memory B/W (TB/s)	8	4	32	32	131	281.6	2,048	131

== Software environment ==
=== Operating system ===
The SX-1 and SX-2 ran the ACOS-4 based SX-OS. The SX-3 onwards run the SUPER-UX operating system (OS); the Earth Simulator runs a custom version of this OS.

=== Compilers ===
SUPER-UX comes with Fortran and C++ compilers. Cray has also developed an Ada compiler which is available as an option.

=== Software ===
Some vertical applications are available through NEC, but in general customers are expected to develop much of their own software. In addition to commercial applications, there is a wide body of free software for the UNIX environment which can be compiled and run on SUPER-UX, such as Emacs, and Vim. A port of GCC is also available for the platform.

=== SX-Aurora TSUBASA ===
The SX-Aurora TSUBASA PCIe card is running in a Linux machine, the Vector Host (VH), which provides operating system services to the Vector Engine (VE). The VE operating system VEOS runs in user space on the VH. Applications compiled for the VE can use almost all Linux system calls, they are transparently forwarded and executed on the VH. The components of VEOS are licensed under the GNU General Public License.

Records
Preceded by Fujitsu VP2600/10; 4.0 gigaflops	World's most powerful supercomputer (NEC SX-3/44); 1992	Succeeded by Thinking Machines CM-5/1024; 59.7 gigaflops
