= Monty Denneau =

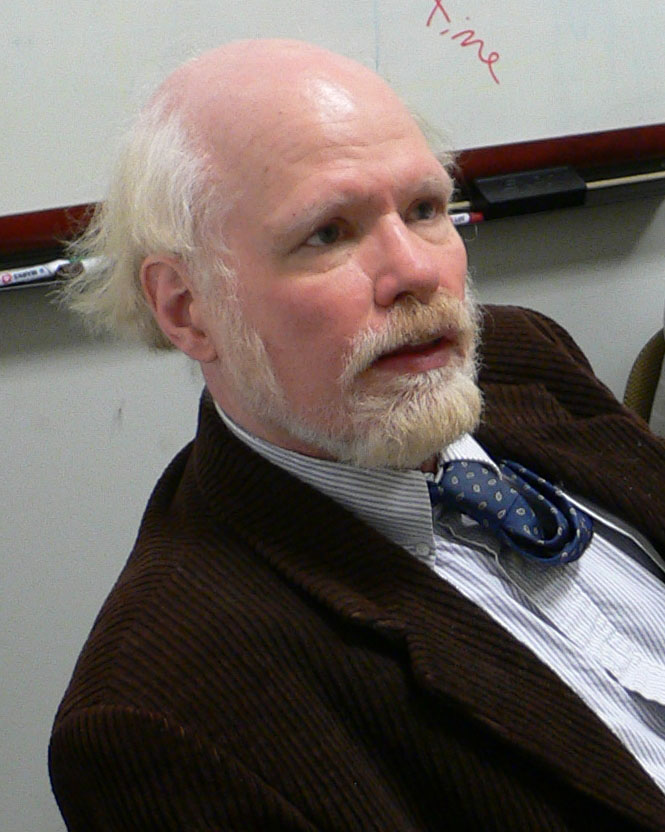
- Occupations: Computer architect and mathematician
- Notable work: 2002 Seymour Cray Computer Engineering Award

Monty Montague Denneau is a computer architect and mathematician. Denneau was awarded the 2002 Seymour Cray Computer Engineering Award for "ingenious and sustained contributions to designs and implementations at the frontier of high performance computing leading to widely used industrial products."

Denneau currently works for IBM, where he is the chief system architect for the Cyclops64 family of supercomputers. In 2013, he was named an IBM Fellow, the company's highest technical honor.
