= Tadashi Watanabe =

Japanese computer engineer (born 1944)

Tadashi Watanabe (渡辺 貞, Watanabe Tadashi, born October 1944) is a Japanese computer engineer. Watanabe is the project manager of the RIKEN Next-Generation Supercomputer R&D Center. He played a central role in the development of the NEC SX architecture. Watanabe was awarded the Eckert–Mauchly Award in 1998, and the Seymour Cray Computer Engineering Award in 2006.
