= Steve Scott (computer architect) =

Computer Architect

Scott, Steve
- Education: University of Wisconsin–Madison
- Known for: Supercomputers
- Scientific career
- Fields: computer scientist, and electrical engineer
- Workplaces: Cray Research; Nvidia

Steve Scott is a computer architect who currently serves as Corporate Vice President at Microsoft. Scott was previously a Senior Vice President and Chief Technology Officer at Cray Inc., Principal Engineer at Google and the chief technology officer for Nvidia's Tesla business unit. Scott was employed by Cray Research, Inc., Silicon Graphics, Inc., and Cray, Inc. from 1992 to 2011 (with a brief hiatus in 2005).

He holds 42 patents. In 2005 Scott received both the ACM Maurice Wilkes Award and the IEEE Seymour Cray Computer Engineering Award.

Scott is a graduate of the University of Wisconsin–Madison, where he received a B.S. in electrical and computing engineering, an M.S. in computer science, and a Ph.D. in computer architecture. He resides in Seattle, Washington.
