= Steve Wallach =

American computer engineer

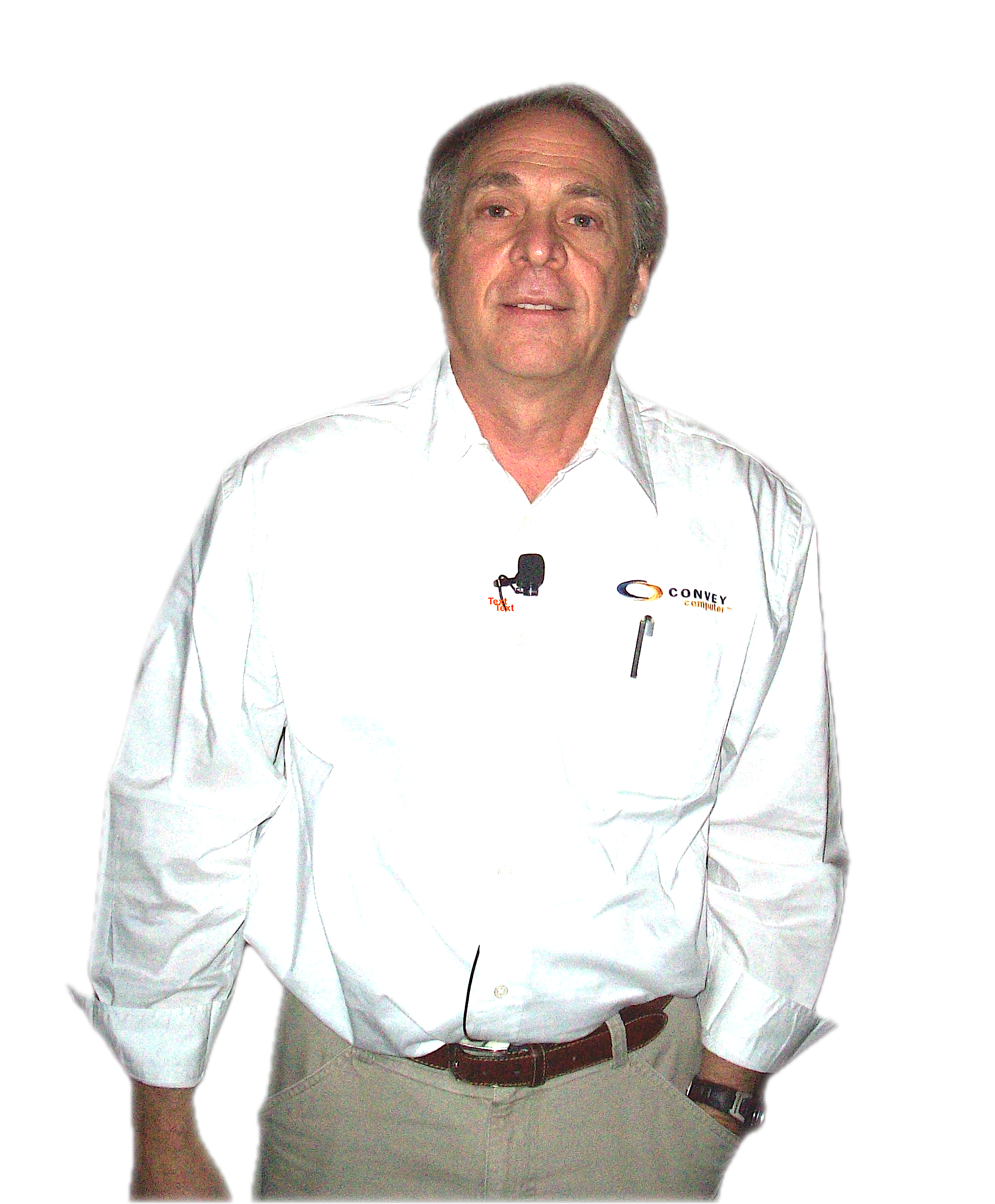
Steve Wallach at Supercomputing 2008

Steven "Steve" J. Wallach (born September 1945 in Brooklyn, New York) is an engineer, consultant and technology manager. He is a Seymour Cray Computer Engineering Award recipient.

== Education ==
Wallach received his BS in electrical engineering from Polytechnic University in Brooklyn, his MS in electrical engineering, from University of Pennsylvania and an MBA from Boston University.

== Career ==
Wallach retired from Micron, and is currently a guest scientist at LANL (Los Alamos). He is also a visiting scientist at the Barcelona Supercomputer Center (BSC). Main focus on HPC RISC-V technology. Wallach was the co-founder and CTO of Convey Computers. After Micron Technology bought Convey, Wallach became a design director. Wallach was previously Vice President of technology for Chiaro Networks and was co-founder of Convex Computer, their Chief Technology Officer and Senior V.P. of Development. After Hewlett-Packard bought Convex, Wallach became the chief technology officer of Hewlett-Packard's large systems group. He was also a visiting professor at Rice University from 1998–1999. Prior to Convex, he was manager of Advanced Development for Data General. His efforts on the MV/8000 are chronicled in Tracy Kidder's Pulitzer Prize winner The Soul of a New Machine. Prior to that, he was an engineer at Raytheon, where he worked on the All Applications Digital Computer (AADC).

Wallach has 106 American patents and is a member of the National Academy of Engineering, a IEEE Fellow and was a founding member of PITAC (The Presidential Information Technology Advisory Committee).

He is currently an adviser to Centerpoint Venture partners, Sevin Rosen Funds, and Interwest, and a consultant to the United States Department of Energy Advanced Scientific Computing (ASC) program at Los Alamos National Laboratory. He donated his personal library of papers and engineering notebooks to the Computer Museum. In 2023 he was interviewed by the ACM History Committee

== Awards ==
Wallach was awarded in 2008 Seymour Cray Computer Science and Engineering Award for his "contribution to high-performance computing through the design of innovative vector and parallel computing systems, notably the Convex mini-supercomputer series, a distinguished industrial career and acts of public service." In 2002 he received the IEEE Computer Society Charles Babbage Award. Member Eta Kappa Nu & Tau Beta Pi. In 2024 he was named as one of the HPC legends.
