= Seymour Cray Computer Engineering Award =

- Awarded for: Significant and innovative contributions in the field of high-performance computing
- Country: New Jersey (United States)
- Presented by: Institute of Electrical and Electronics Engineers (IEEE)
- Reward: US $10,000
- First award: 1999
- Website: www.computer.org/web/awards/cray

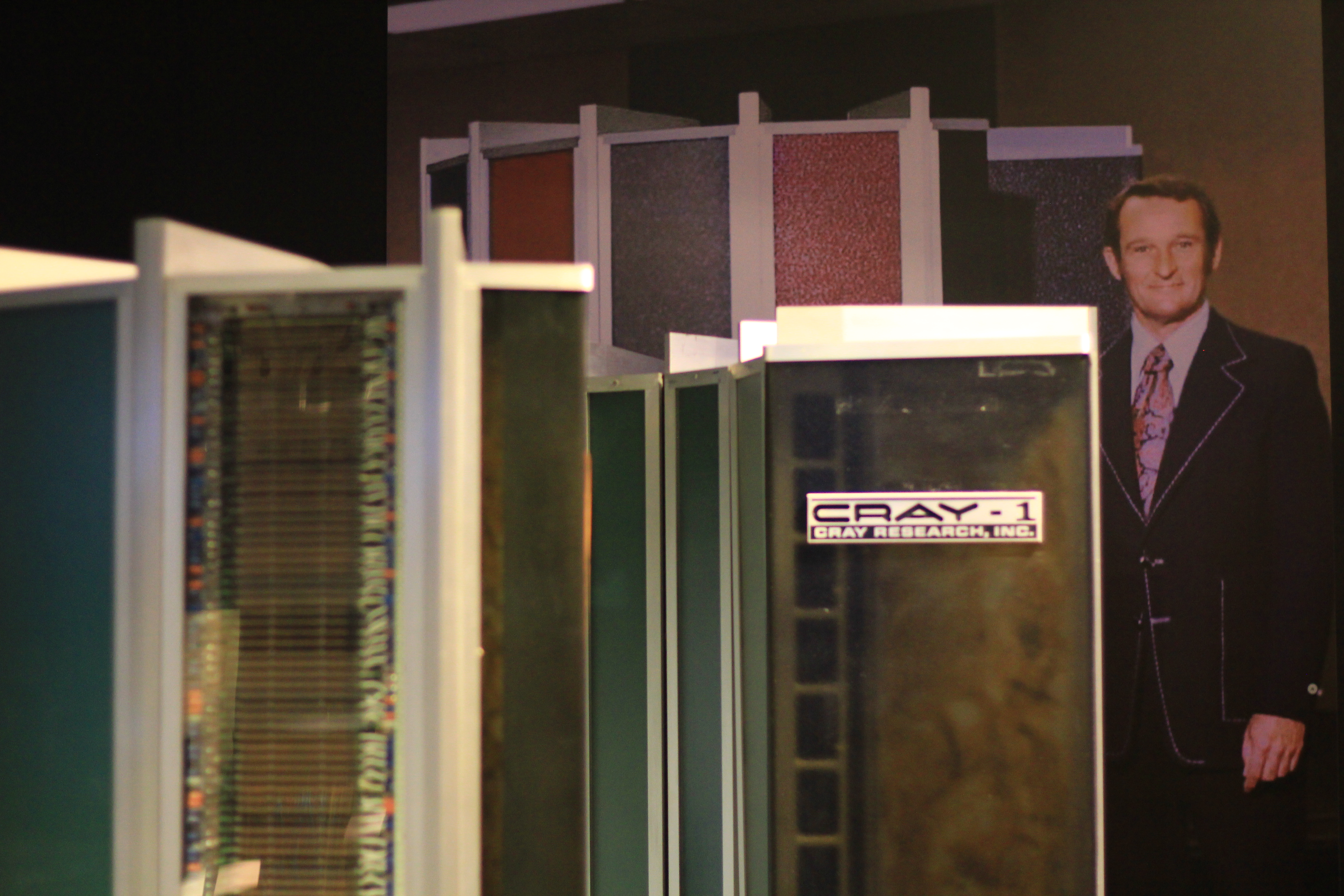
Seymour Cray peeking out behind a Cray-1.

The Seymour Cray Computer Engineering Award, also known as the Seymour Cray Award, is an award given by the IEEE Computer Society, to recognize significant and innovative contributions in the field of high-performance computing. The award honors scientists who exhibit the creativity demonstrated by Seymour Cray, founder of Cray Research, Inc., and an early pioneer of supercomputing. Cray was an American electrical engineer and supercomputer architect who designed a series of computers that were the fastest in the world for decades, and founded Cray Research which built many of these machines. Called "the father of supercomputing," Cray has been credited with creating the supercomputer industry. He played a key role in the invention and design of the UNIVAC 1103, a landmark high-speed computer and the first computer available for commercial use.

In 1972 the IEEE presented Cray with the Harry H. Goode Memorial Award for his contributions to large-scale computer design and the development of multiprocessing systems. One year after Cray's death in 1996, IEEE created the Seymour Cray Computer Engineering Award in honor of his creative spirit. The award is one of the 12 technical awards sponsored by the IEEE computer society as recognition given to pioneers in the field of computer science and engineering. The winner receives a crystal memento, certificate, and US$10,000 honorarium.

The first recipient, in 1999, was John Cocke.

== Nomination and Ceremony ==
The following criteria are considered when selecting a recipient:

- Leadership in field
- Breadth of work
- Achievement in other fields
- Inventive value (patents)
- Individual vs. group contribution
- Publications (articles, etc.)
- Originality of contribution
- Quality of nomination
- IEEE Society activities and honors
- Quality of endorsements

The annual nomination deadline is July 1. Anyone may nominate a candidate, although self-nomination is not allowed. A candidate must receive at least three nominations to be considered by the award committee. Nominations should be prepared and submitted through the IEEE official website.

The Seymour Cray Computer Engineering Award presentation and reception are held at the SC conference, the international conference for high-performance computing networks, storage, and analysis. The conference is sponsored by the ACM (Association for Computing Machinery) and the IEEE Computer Society. It is held annually in mid-November. Several other IEEE sponsored awards are presented at the same event, including the ACM Gordon Bell Prize, the ACM/IEEE-CS Ken Kennedy Award, the ACM/IEEE-CS George Michael Memorial HPC Fellowship, the ACM SIGHPC / Intel Computational & Data Science Fellowships, the IEEE-CS Seymour Cray Computer Engineering Award, and the IEEE-CS Sidney Fernbach Memorial Award.

== Recipients ==
Year	Recipients	Country	Citation
1999	John Cocke	(United States)	"For unique and creative contributions to the computer industry through innovative high performance system designs."
2000	Glen J. Culler	(United States)	"For pioneering contributions to the foundation and practice of high performance computing in array and very long instruction word (VLIW) processing especially for use in interactive scientific exploration."
2001	John L. Hennessy	(United States)	"For pioneering contributions to the foundation, teaching, and practice of high performance computing, especially in distributed shared memory multiprocessor architectures and in design and application of reduced instruction set architectures."
2002	Monty Denneau	(United States)	"For ingenious and sustained contributions to designs and implementations at the frontier of high performance computing leading to widely used industrial products."
2003	Burton J. Smith	(United States)	"For ingenious and sustained contributions to designs and implementations at the frontier of high performance computing and especially for sustained championing of the use of multithreading to enable parallel execution and overcome latency and to achieve high performance in industrially significant products."
2004	William J. Dally	(United States)	"For fundamental contributions to the design and engineering of high-performance interconnection networks, parallel computer architectures, and high-speed signaling technology."
2005	Steven L. Scott	(United States)	"For advancing supercomputer architecture through the development of the Cray T3E, the Cray X1 and the Cray Black Widow".
2006	Tadashi Watanabe	(Japan)	"For serving as lead designer of the NEC SX series of supercomputers, and especially for the design of the Earth Simulator, which was the world's fastest supercomputer from 2002 to 2004."
2007	Ken Batcher	(United States)	"For fundamental theoretical and practical contributions to massively parallel computation, including parallel sorting algorithms, interconnection networks, and pioneering designs of the STARAN and MPP computers."
2008	Steve Wallach	(United States)	For his "contribution to high-performance computing through design of innovative vector and parallel computing systems, notably the Convex mini-supercomputer series, a distinguished industrial career and acts of public service."
2009	Kenichi Miura	(Japan)	For his "ingenuity in developing supercomputer software and hardware that advanced the state-of-the art in technical computing."
2010	Alan Gara	(United States)	For his "innovations in low power, densely packaged supercomputing systems."
2011	Charles L. Seitz	(United States)	"For innovations in high-performance message passing architectures and networks."
2012	Peter M. Kogge	(United States)	For "innovations in advanced computer architecture and systems."
2013	Marc Snir	(Israel)	For his "contributions to the research, development, theory, and standardization of high-performance parallel computing including the IBM RS/6000 SP and Blue Gene systems."
2014	Gordon Bell	(United States)	"For his exceptional contributions in designing and bringing several computer systems to market that changed the world of high performance computing and of computing in general, the two most important of these being the PDP-6 and the VAX-11/780."
2015	Mateo Valero	(Spain)	"In recognition of seminal contributions to vector, out-of-order, multithreaded, and VLIW architectures."
2016	William Camp	(United States)	"For visionary leadership of the Red Storm project, and for decades of leadership of the HPC community."
2018	David E. Shaw	(United States)	"For the design of special-purpose supercomputers for biomolecular simulations."
2019	David B. Kirk	(United States)	"For outstanding leadership in developing GPU computing and in engendering its rise to the mainstream of HPC."
2022	Satoshi Matsuoka	(Japan)	"For long-term global leadership in supercomputing system design, such as TSUBAME and Fugaku."
2024	Norman Jouppi	(United States)	"For the design and deployment of special-purpose supercomputers for artificial intelligence."
2025	John Shalf	(United States)	"For for leadership in HPC and work co-designing energy efficient HPC hardware and software."

== See also ==
- List of computer-related awards
- List of computer science awards
- List of prizes named after people
- IEEE John von Neumann Medal
- Gordon Bell Prize
