= Cellular architecture =

Type of computer architecture prominent in parallel computing

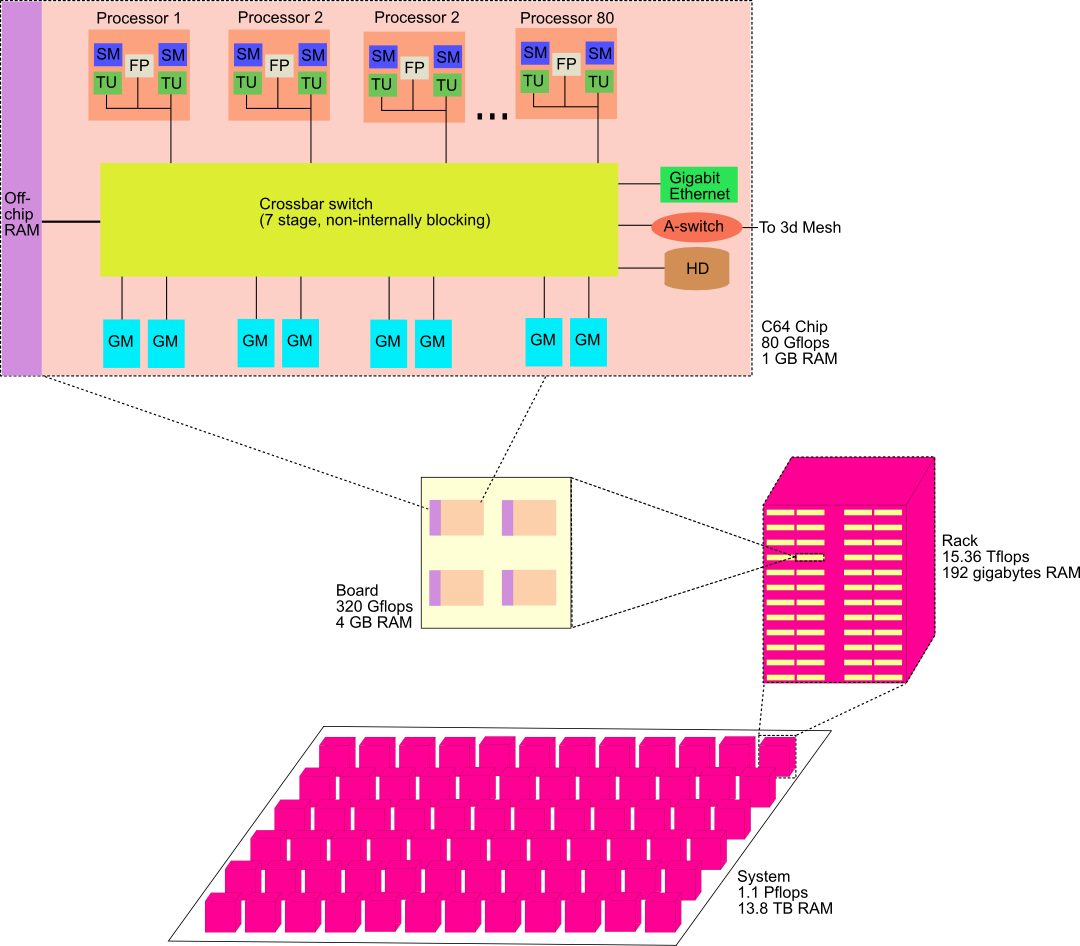
The Cyclops64 architecture contains many hundreds of computing nodes

Cellular architecture is a type of computer architecture associated with parallel computing. It extends multi-core architecture by organizing processing into independent "cells," where each cell contains thread units, memory, and communication links. This design enables large numbers of concurrent threads to run within a single processor, with performance gains achieved through thread-level parallelism.

The most commercially recognized implementation was IBM's Cell microprocessor, a nine-core design used in the PlayStation 3 (2006–2017). Another example was Cyclops64, a massively parallel research architecture developed by IBM in the 2000s.

Cellular architectures follow a low-level programming paradigm, exposing the programmer to much of the underlying hardware. This allows for fine-grained optimization but makes software development more complex.

== See also ==
- Cellular automaton
