= NEC SX-6 =

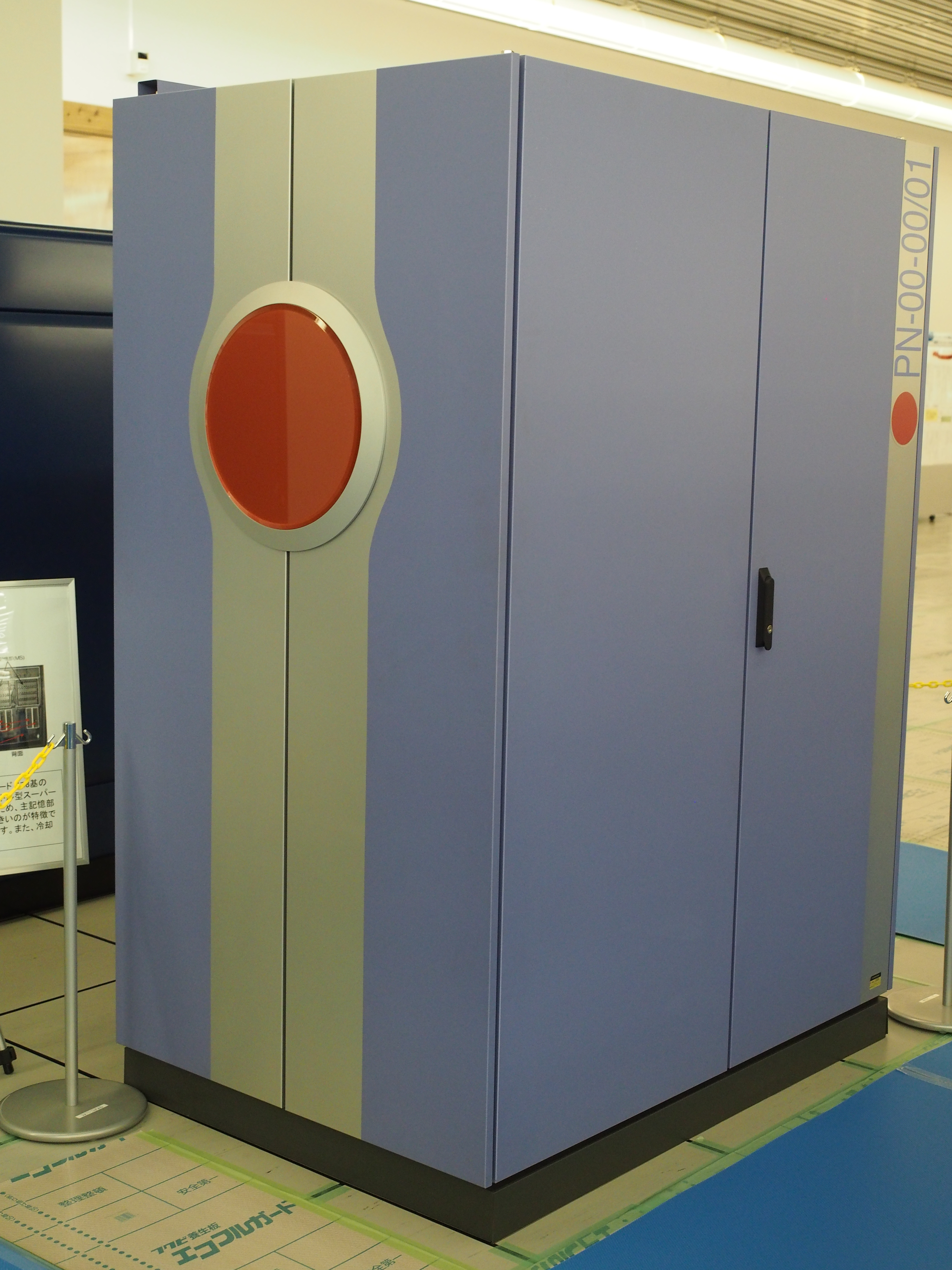
Original Earth Simulator processing rack

The SX-6 is a NEC SX supercomputer built by NEC Corporation that debuted in 2001; the SX-6 was sold under license by Cray Inc. in the U.S. Each SX-6 single-node system contains up to eight vector processors, which share up to 64 GB of computer memory. The SX-6 processor is a single chip implementation containing a vector processor unit and a scalar processor fabricated in a 0.15 μm CMOS process with copper interconnects, whereas the SX-5 was a multi-chip implementation. The Earth Simulator is based on the SX-6 architecture.

The vector processor is made up of eight vector pipeline units each with seventy-two 256-word vector registers. The vector unit performs add/shift, multiply, divide and logical operations. The scalar unit is 64 bits wide and contains a 64 KB cache. The scalar unit can decode, issue and complete four instructions per clock cycle. Branch prediction and speculative execution is supported. A multi-node system is configured by interconnecting up to 128 single-node systems via a high-speed, low-latency IXS (Internode Crossbar Switch).

The peak performance of the SX-6 series vector processors is 8 GFLOPS. Thus a single-node system provides a peak performance of 64 GFLOPS, while a multi-node system provides up to 8 TFLOPS of peak floating-point performance.

The SX-6 uses SUPER-UX, a Unix-like operating system developed by NEC. A SAN-based global file system (NEC's GFS) is available for a multinode installation. The default batch processing system is NQSII, but open source batch systems such as Sun Grid Engine are also supported.

== See also ==
- SUPER-UX
- NEC SX
- Earth Simulator
- NEC Corporation
