= Earth Simulator =

Series of supercomputers for earth sciences

Coordinates: 35°22′51″N 139°37′34.8″E

The Earth Simulator (ES) (地球シミュレータ, Chikyū Shimyurēta) is a series of supercomputers deployed at Japan Agency for Marine-Earth Science and Technology Yokohama Institute of Earth Sciences.

== Earth Simulator (first generation) ==
Earth Simulator
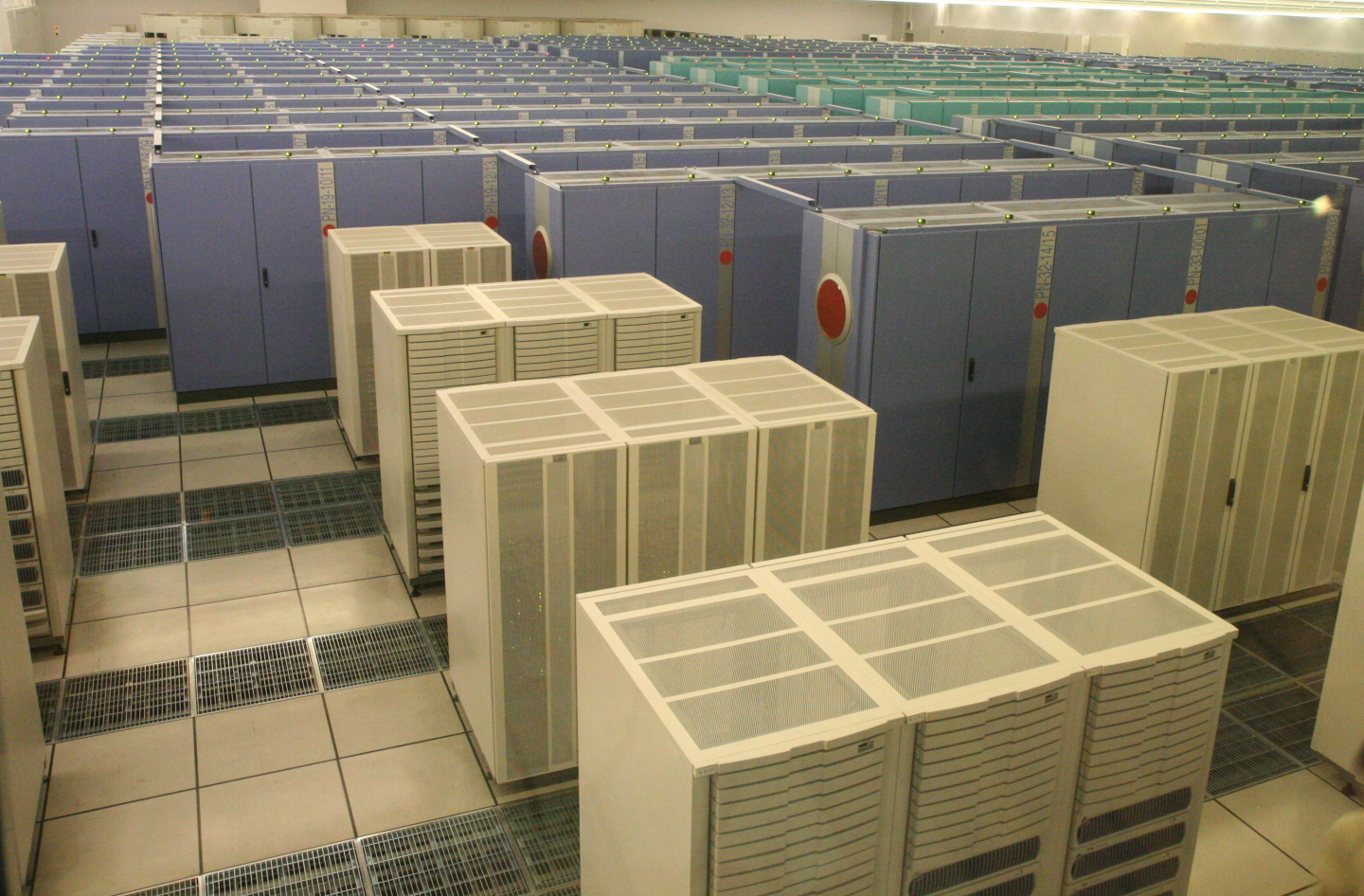
- Earth Simulator (first generation)
- Active: 2002–2009
- Operators: NASDA, JAERI, JAMSTEC
- Location: JAMSTEC Yokohama Institute for Earth Sciences
- Architecture: 640 processor nodes (each consists of 8 vector arithmetic processors) interconnected by single-stage crossbar switches
- Operating system: SUPER-UX
- Space: 65 m × 50 m (213 ft × 164 ft)
- Memory: 10 TB total
- Speed: 40 TFLOPS (peak)
- Ranking: TOP500: 1, June 2002

The first generation of Earth Simulator, developed by the Japanese government's initiative "Earth Simulator Project", was a highly parallel vector supercomputer system for running global climate models to evaluate the effects of global warming and problems in solid earth geophysics. The system was developed for Japan Aerospace Exploration Agency, Japan Atomic Energy Research Institute, and Japan Marine Science and Technology Center (JAMSTEC) in 1997. Construction started in October 1999, and the site officially opened on 11 March 2002. The project cost 60 billion yen.

Built by NEC, ES was based on their SX-6 architecture. It consisted of 640 nodes with eight vector processors and 16 gigabytes of computer memory at each node, for a total of 5120 processors and 10 terabytes of memory. Two nodes were installed per 1 metre × 1.4 metre × 2 metre cabinet. Each cabinet consumed 20 kW of power. The system had 700 terabytes of disk storage (450 for the system and 250 for the users) and 1.6 petabytes of mass storage in tape drives. It was able to run holistic simulations of global climate in both the atmosphere and the oceans down to a resolution of 10 km. Its performance on the LINPACK benchmark was 35.86 TFLOPS, which was almost five times faster than the previous fastest supercomputer, ASCI White.

ES was the fastest supercomputer in the world from 2002 to 2004. Its capacity was surpassed by IBM's Blue Gene/L prototype on 29 September 2004.

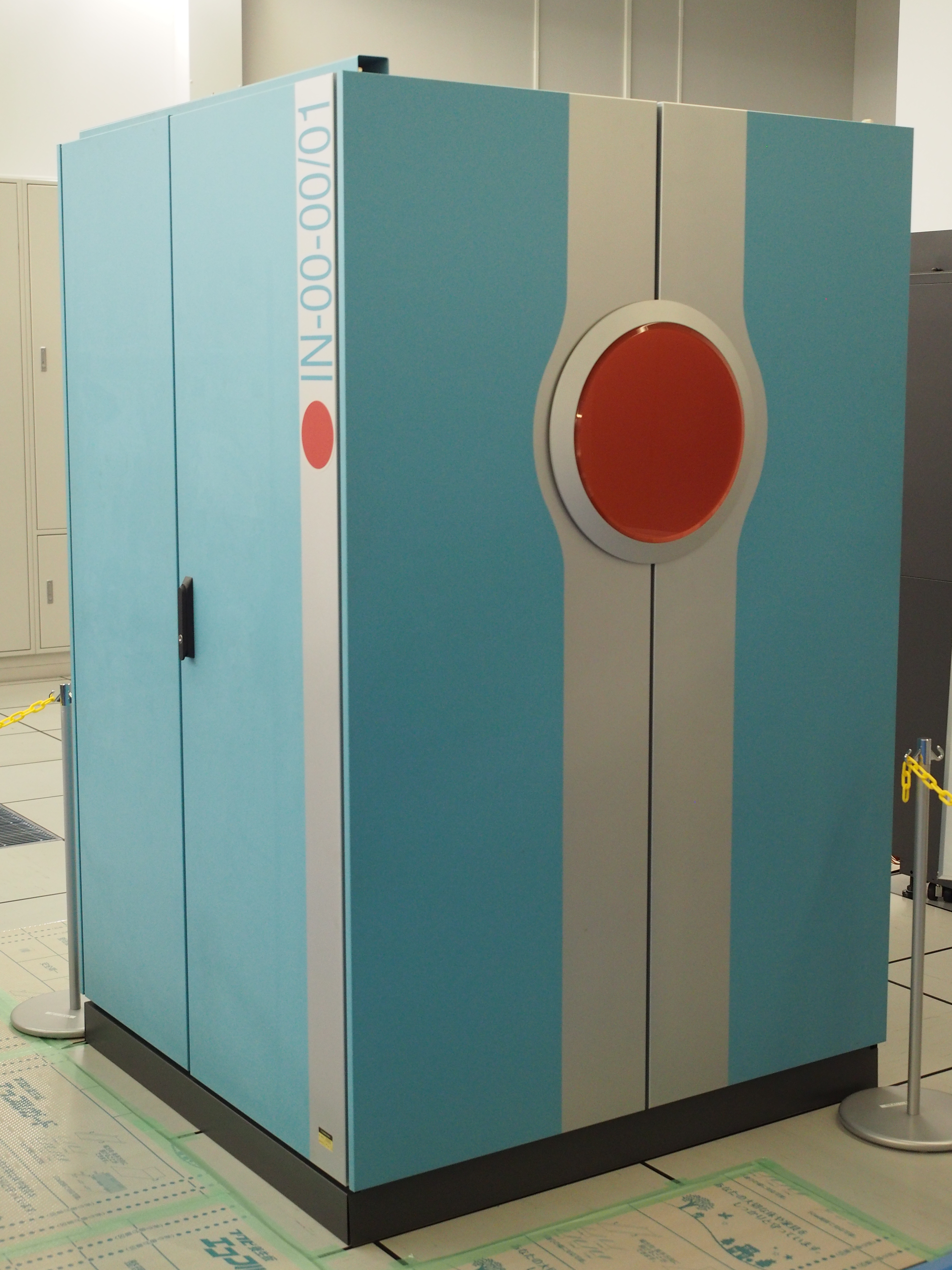
Earth Simulator interconnection rack

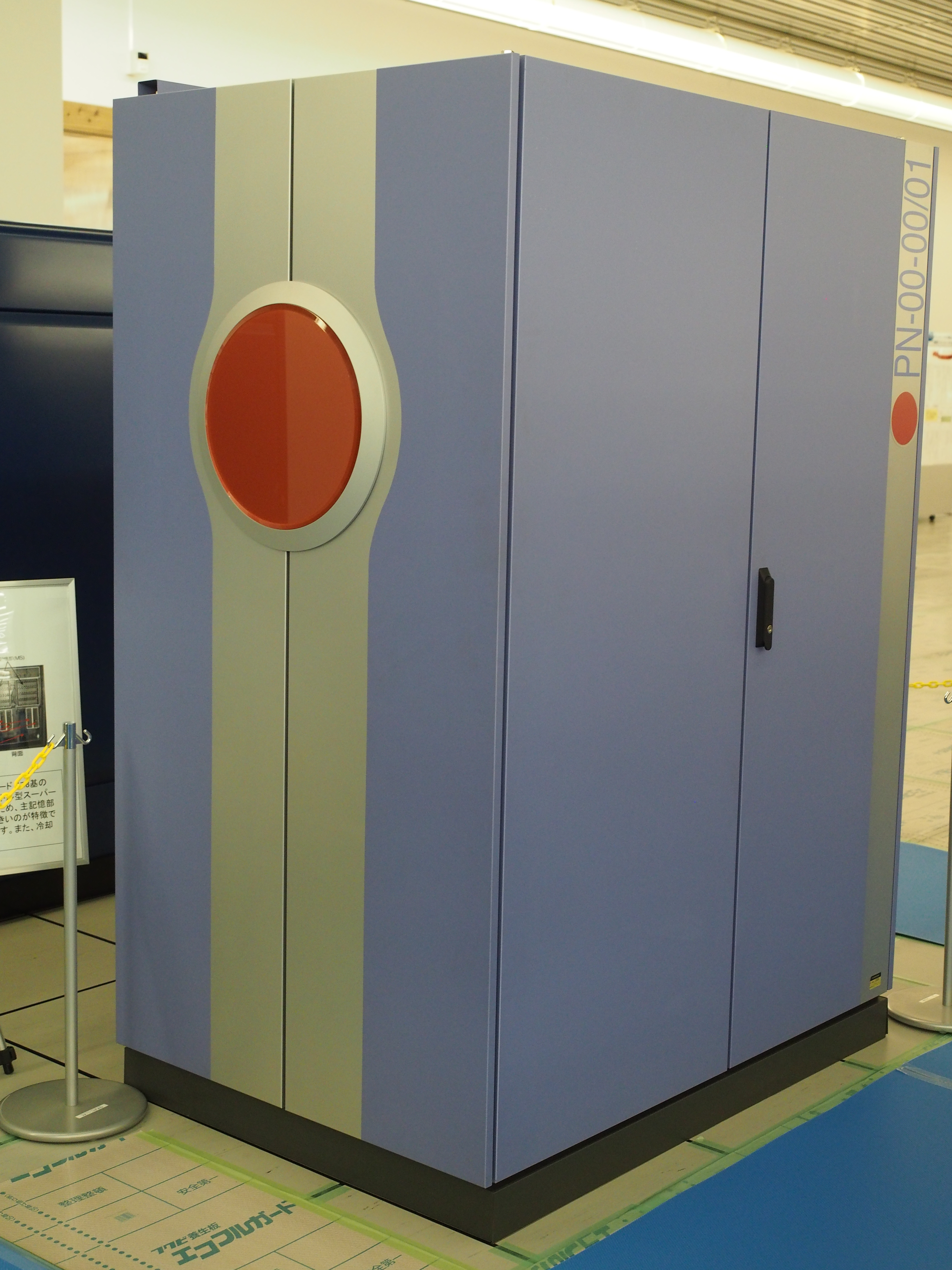
Earth Simulator processing rack

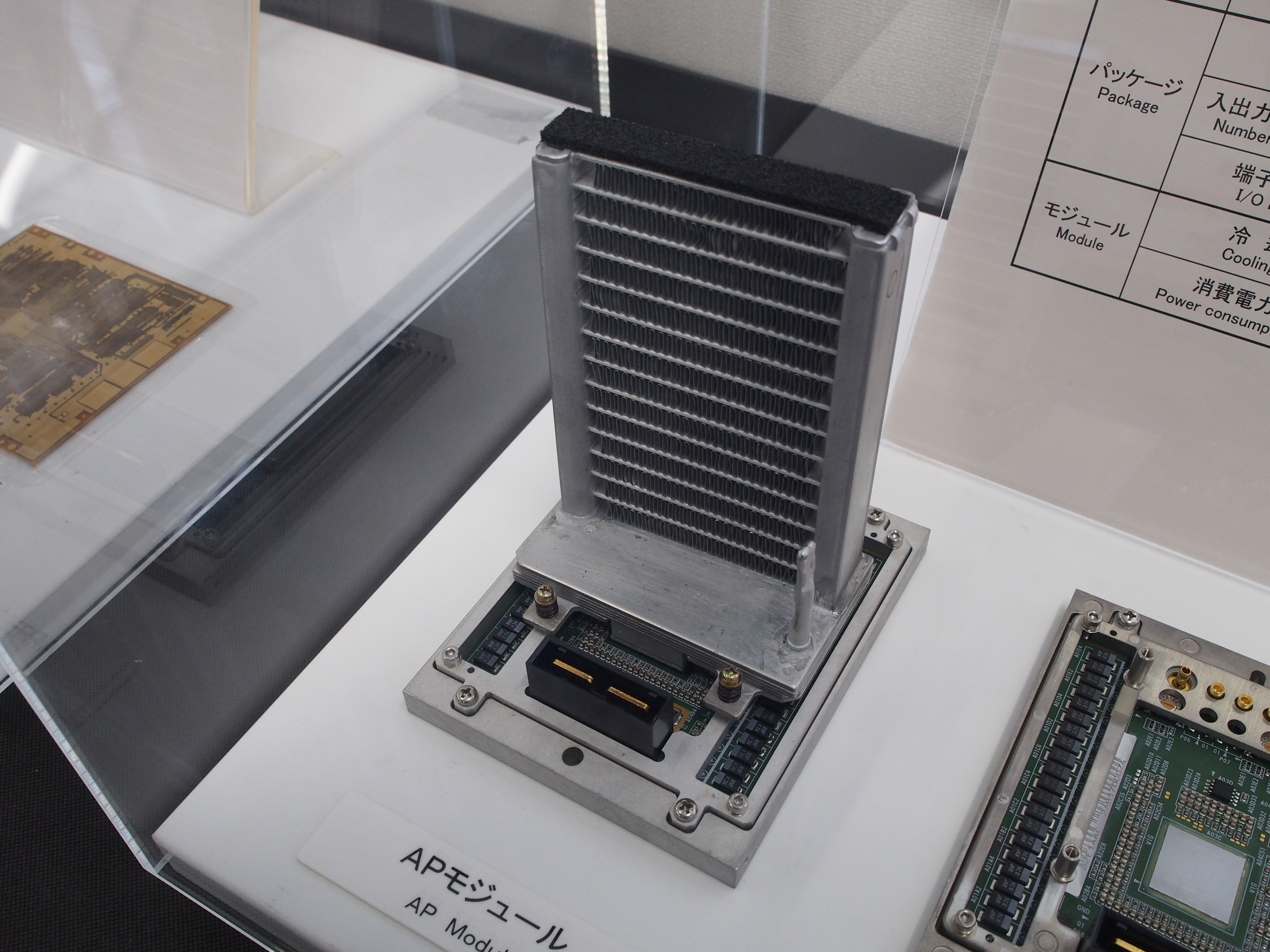
Earth Simulator arithmetic processing module

== Earth Simulator (second generation) ==
Earth Simulator 2
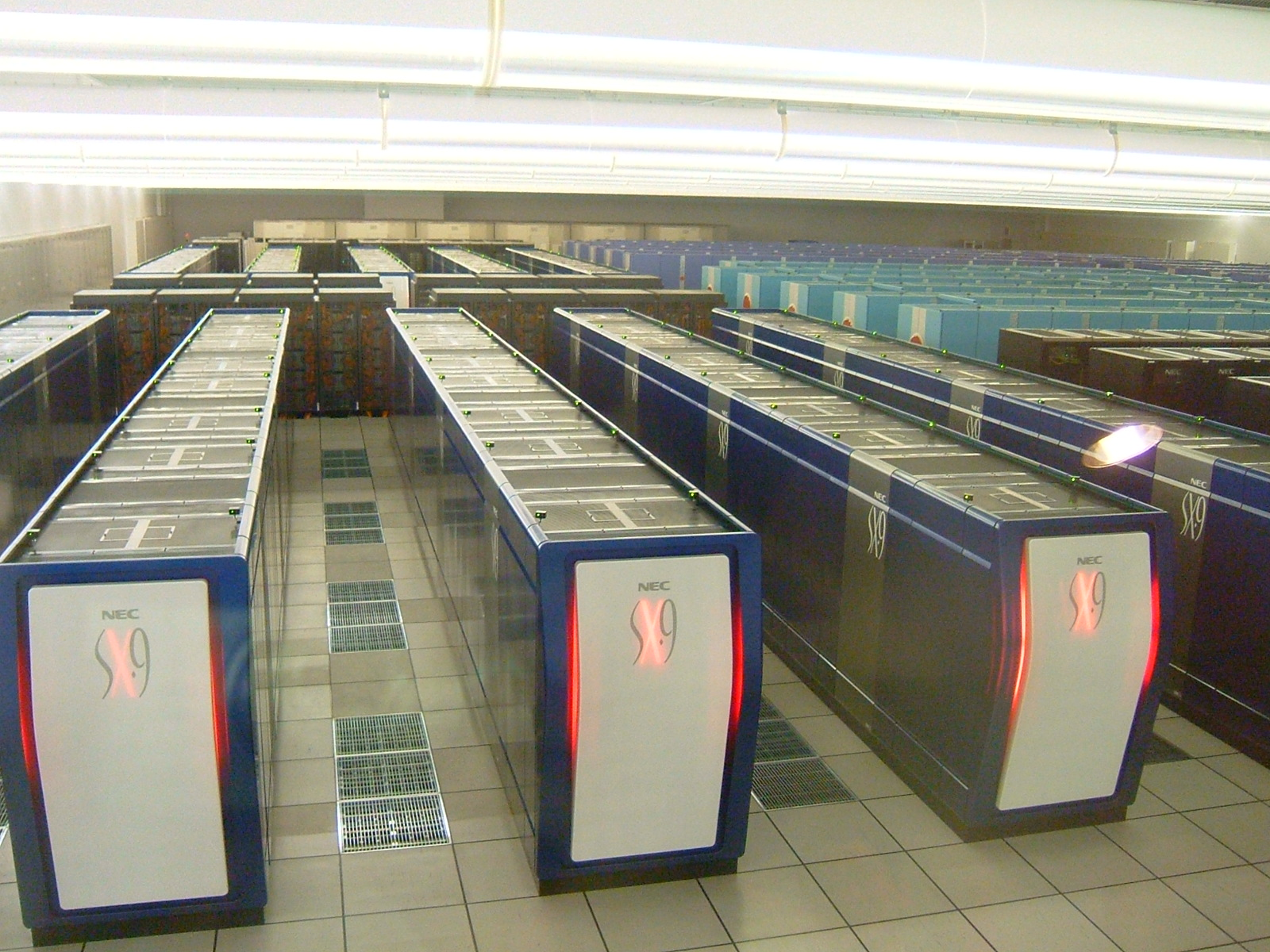
- Earth Simulator (second generation)
- Active: 2009–2015
- Architecture: 160 nodes of NEC SX-9E vector computers
- Operating system: SUPER-UX
- Speed: 131 TFLOPS (peak)
- Ranking: TOP500: 22, June 2009

ES was replaced by the Earth Simulator 2 (ES2) in March 2009. ES2 is an NEC SX-9/E system, and has a quarter as many nodes each of 12.8 times the performance (3.2× clock speed, four times the processing resource per node), for a peak performance of 131 TFLOPS. With a delivered LINPACK performance of 122.4 TFLOPS, ES2 was the most efficient supercomputer in the world at that point. In November 2010, NEC announced that ES2 topped the Global FFT, one of the measures of the HPC Challenge Awards, with the performance number of 11.876 TFLOPS.

== Earth Simulator (third generation) ==
Earth Simulator 3
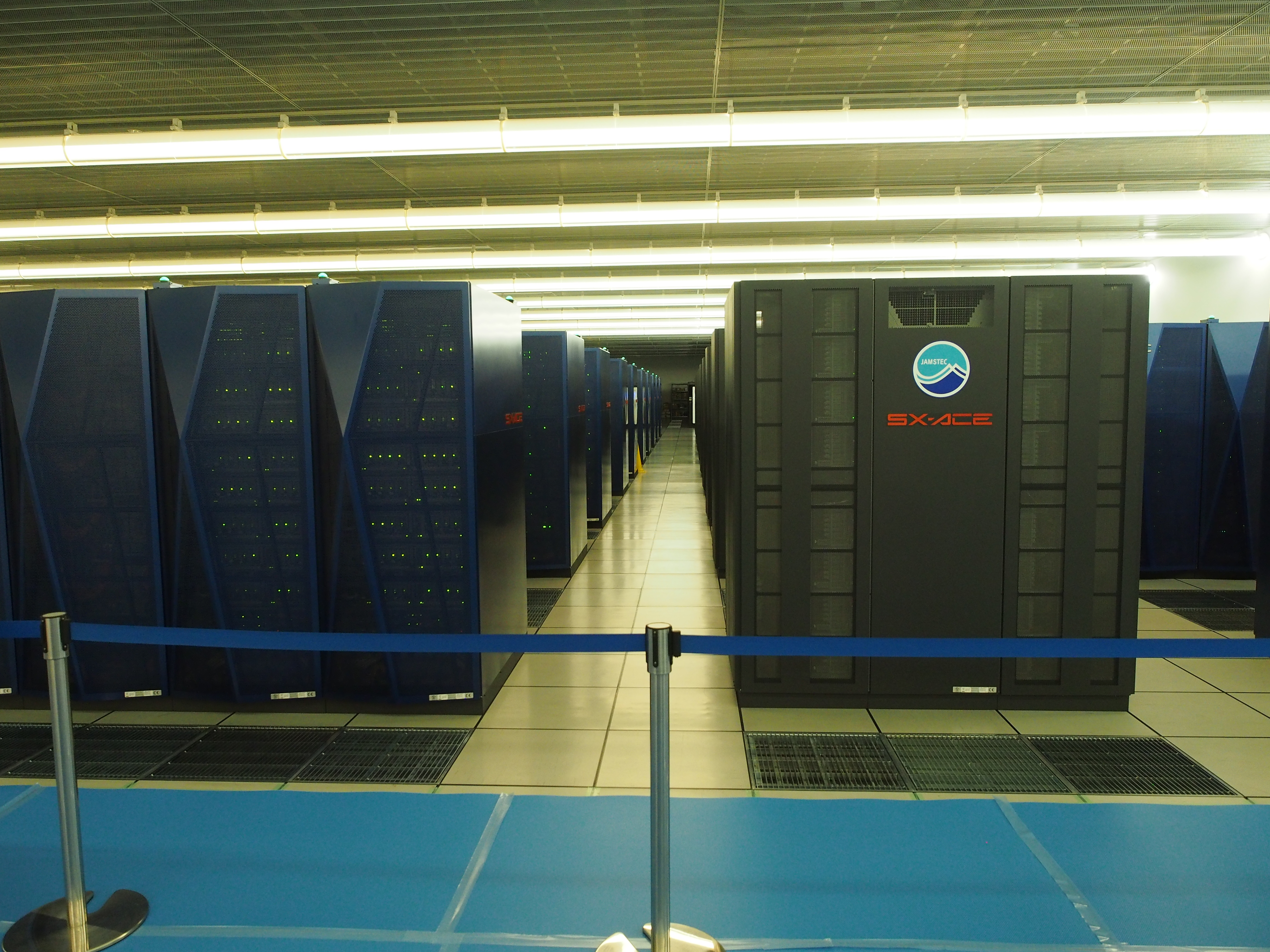
- Earth Simulator (third generation)
- Active: 2015–2021
- Architecture: 5120 nodes of NEC SX-ACE
- Operating system: SUPER-UX
- Speed: 1.3 PFLOPS (peak)

ES2 was replaced by the Earth Simulator 3 (ES3) in March 2015. ES3 is a NEC SX-ACE system with 5120 nodes, and a performance of 1.3 PFLOPS.

ES3, from 2017 to 2018, ran alongside Gyoukou, a supercomputer with immersion cooling that can achieve up to 19 PFLOPS.

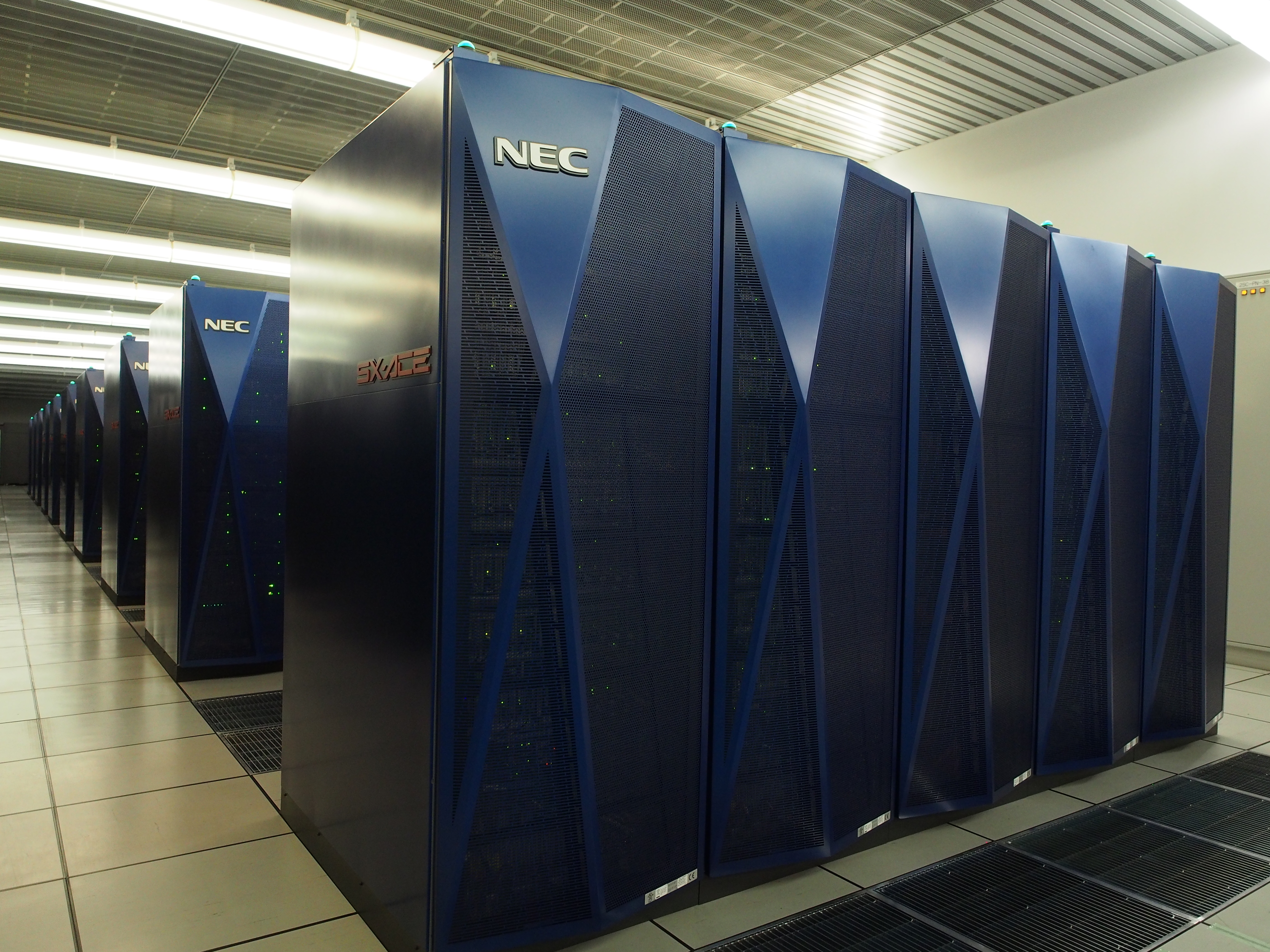
Earth Simulator 3

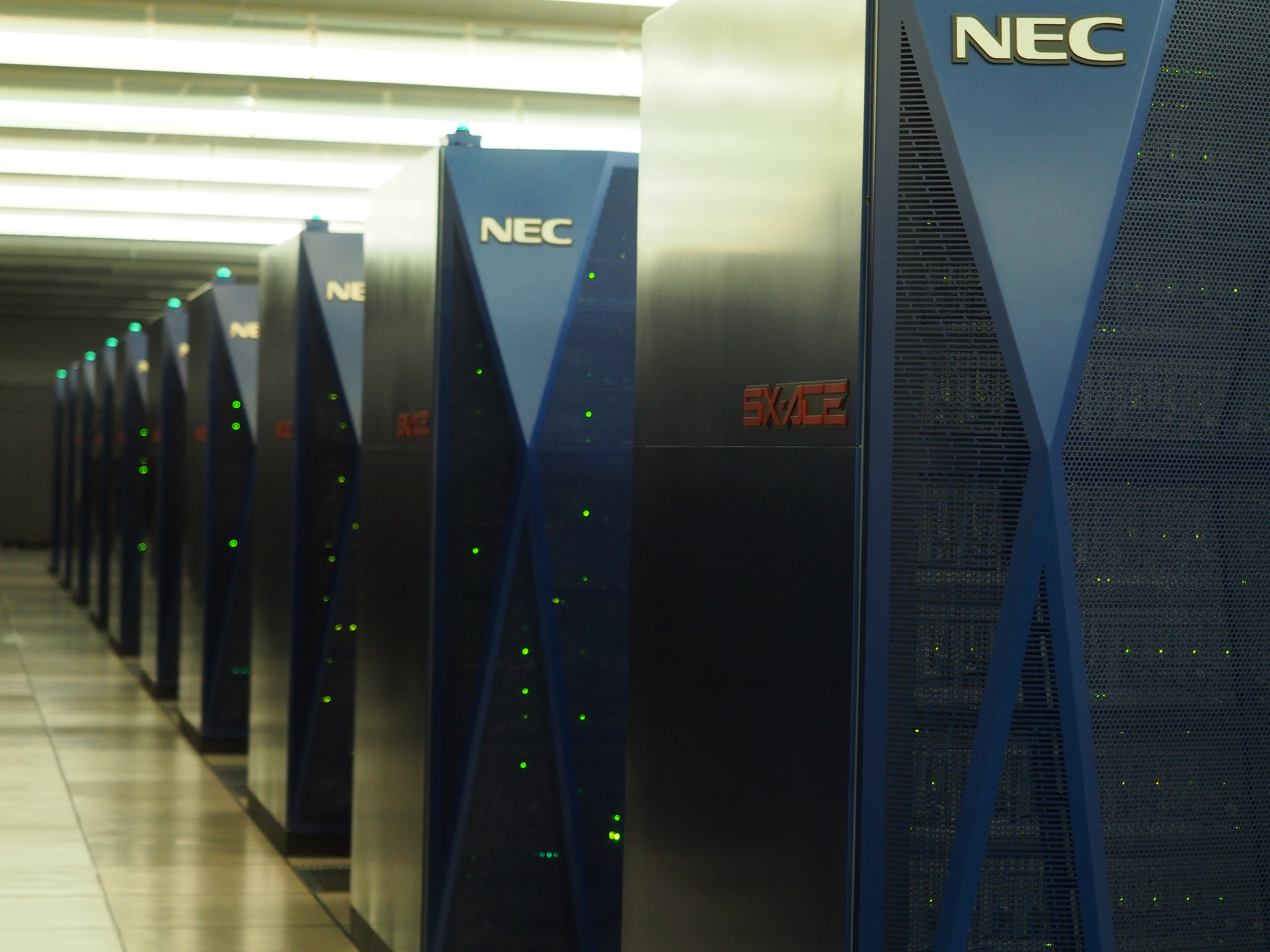
Earth Simulator 3

== Earth Simulator (fourth generation) ==
Earth Simulator 4
- Active: operational 2021
- Architecture: Multi-architecture (AMD EPYC 7742, NEC SX-Aurora TSUBASA, NVIDIA A100) interconnected by InfiniBand HDR200
- Operating system: CentOS 8
- Speed: 19.5 PFLOPS (peak) / 13.45 PFLOPS (peak)
- Ranking: TOP500: 39, June 2021

The Earth Simulator 4 (ES4) uses AMD EPYC processors, with acceleration by the NEC SX-Aurora TSUBASA Vector Engine and NVIDIA Ampere A100 GPUs.

== See also ==
- Supercomputing in Japan
- Effects of climate change
- NCAR
- HadCM3
- EdGCM

Records
Preceded by ASCI White; 7.226 teraflops	World's most powerful supercomputer March 2002 – November 2004	Succeeded by Blue Gene/L; 70.72 teraflops
