= SUPER-UX =

- Developer: NEC
- OS family: Unix System V
- Working state: Discontinued
- Latest release: R21.1 / March 2014; 12 years ago
- Marketing target: Supercomputing
- Supported platforms: NEC SX supercomputers
- License: Proprietary

SUPER-UX was a version of the Unix operating system from NEC that is used on its SX series of supercomputers.

== History ==
The initial version of SUPER-UX was based on UNIX System V version 3.1 with features from BSD 4.3. The version for the NEC SX-9 was based on SVR4.2MP with BSD enhancements.

== Features ==
SUPER-UX is a 64-bit UNIX operating system. It supports the Supercomputer File System (SFS).

== Earth Simulator ==
The Earth Simulator uses a custom OS called "ESOS" (Earth Simulator Operating System) based on SUPER-UX. It has many enhanced features custom designed for the Earth Simulator which are not in the regular SUPER-UX OS.

== See also ==
- EWS-UX
