= Mark Tester =

Australian botanist

- Born: Mark Alfred Tester; 6 March 1963 (age 62); Tasmania, Australia
- Education: University of Adelaide, University of Cambridge
- Awards: Recognized by the American Society of Plant Biologists in 2010 for "publishing the most influential science"
- Scientific career
- Fields: Botany
- Institutions: King Abdullah University of Science and Technology, Australian Centre for Plant Functional Genomics, University of Adelaide
- Thesis: Studies of ion channels in Chara corallina (1988)
- Doctoral advisor: Enid MacRobbie

Mark Alfred Tester (born 6 March 1963 in Tasmania) is an Australian botanist and professor of plant science at King Abdullah University of Science and Technology, where he is also associate director of the Center for Desert Agriculture. Prior to joining King Abdullah University of Science and Technology in February 2013, he was a professor of plant physiology at the University of Adelaide and the Australian Centre for Plant Functional Genomics from 2009 to 2013.

== Education ==
Tester received his BSc with honours in plant sciences from the University of Adelaide in 1984, and his PhD from the University of Cambridge in 1988, also in plant sciences. For his PhD, he worked with Enid MacRobbie to study potassium ion channels.

== Research ==
Tester's research aims to understand the molecular processes that allow plants to survive in suboptimal conditions. In 2017, he and his colleagues sequenced the entire genome of quinoa, which he originally started studying to determine how it can tolerate high levels of salt. He has also researched ways to develop genetically modified plants, and he and his colleagues have developed a plant that can tolerate high levels of salt.

== Views on genetically modified crops ==
Tester supports the use of genetically modified crops to reduce poverty. In 2002, he worked as a scientific advisor for a BBC1 drama about GM crops. He subsequently criticised the drama's directors, Alan Rusbridger and Ronan Bennett, stating that they had ignored his criticisms of the piece and produced a documentary "to inflame uninformed anti-GM hysteria". Rusbridger replied by claiming that Tester had changed his mind since he had been shown a copy of the piece's script the previous July, when, according to Rusbridger, his view of the piece was much less critical.
