= Peter Wonka =

Austrian computer scientist

- Education: TU Vienna
- Awards: National Science Foundation Career Award (2006)
- Scientific career
- Fields: Computer Graphics, Scientific visualization, Image Processing
- Workplaces: King Abdullah University of Science and Technology Arizona State University
- Thesis: Occlusion Culling for Real-Time Rendering of Urban Environments (2001)
- Doctoral advisor: Michael Gervautz

Peter Wonka is an Austrian computer scientist and a professor and associate director at the Visual Computing Center at King Abdullah University of Science and Technology, Saudi Arabia. He was previously employed at the Arizona State University as an associate professor and is a recipient of the National Science Foundation Career Award.

His main contributions lie in the areas of computer graphics, scientific visualization and image processing.

== Biography ==
Peter Wonka received a master's degree in computer science from Vienna University of Technology in 1997. He continued his graduate studies there, receiving his PhD degree for the thesis "Occlusion Culling for Real-Time Rendering of Urban Environments" in 2001 as well as a master's degree in urban planning in 2002.

After researching at UJF Grenoble and Georgia Institute of Technology, Peter Wonka joined the faculty of Arizona State University in 2004 as an assistant professor and then as an associate professor. In 2011, he relocated to King Abdullah University of Science and Technology, where he is currently employed as a professor.
