= Norman Christ =

American physicist

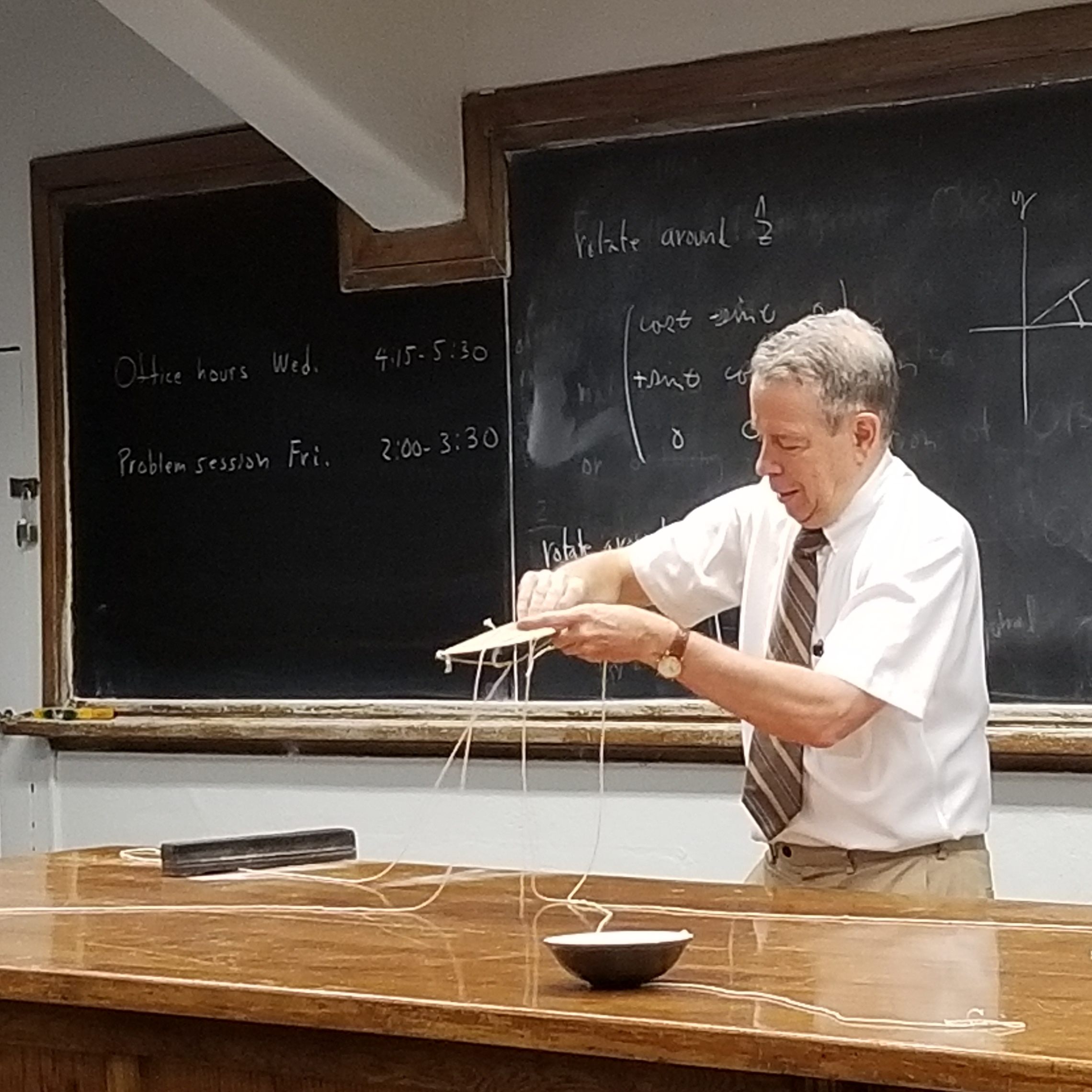
- Born: December 22, 1943 (age 82); Pittsburgh, Pennsylvania, U.S.
- Education: Columbia University
- Known for: Lattice QCD; QCDOC; Blue Gene
- Awards: Sloan Fellowship (1967); Gordon Bell Prize (1998)
- Scientific career
- Fields: Physics
- Workplaces: Columbia University; Princeton University
- Doctoral advisor: Tsung-Dao Lee
- Doctoral students: Emanuel Derman; Yuefan Deng; Adrian Kaehler

Norman Howard Christ (/krɪst/; born 22 December 1943 in Pittsburgh) is a physicist and professor at Columbia University, where he holds the Ephraim Gildor Professorship of Computational Theoretical Physics. He is notable for his research in Lattice QCD.

== Work and life ==
Norman Christ graduated as salutatorian with a B.A. in physics from Columbia in 1965, and received his Ph.D. from the same institution in 1966 under Nobel Laureate Tsung-Dao Lee. Christ became a professor at Columbia after graduation, and has remained there since. He is also a leading researcher at Brookhaven National Laboratory.

Norman's research lies in the field of lattice quantum chromodynamics, simulating the strong interaction among quarks and gluons with Monte Carlo methods. He has worked on various topics in this field, such as the phenomenon of quark confinement, the spontaneous chiral magnetization of the vacuum, and the quark-gluon plasma. In recent years, he has focused on problems in Kaon physics, such as the kaon mass difference, the rare kaon decay, and both direct and indirect CP violation parameter.

== Supercomputer and physics ==
Lattice QCD is extremely computationally intensive. These simulations are usually performed on state-of-the-art supercomputers. Instead of purchasing commercial machines, Norman chose to build supercomputers with his colleagues at Columbia University. The lattice group at Columbia pioneered the construction of highly parallel machines dedicated to QCD calculations in 1982, and produced a series of three successful machines between 1985 and 1989 which were used to obtain a variety of new results in QCD. During this period there were also a number of other dedicated computer projects with similar goals carried out in Italy (the APE Project), Japan (QCD-PAX), and Fermilab (ACP-MAPS) and IBM (GF11) in the U. S.

In 1993, Norman started the QCDSP project, aiming to build a Teraflops supercomputer. The first working hardware was available in August 1995, and a working 6 Gflops machine in July 1996. A 400 Gflops and another 600 Gflops machine are completed in 1998. Norman and his collaborators won the prestigious Gordon Bell Prize in 1998 for designing the QCDSP supercomputer. The next project led by Norman was the QCDOC supercomputers. The computers were designed and built jointly by University of Edinburgh, Columbia University, the RIKEN BNL Brookhaven Research Center and IBM. The target was to build a massively parallel supercomputer able to peak at 10 Tflops with sustained power at 50% capacity. At the end of 2005, there were three QCDOCs in service each reaching 10 Tflops peak operation. QCDOC is considered the precursor of IBM's Blue Gene L machine. After QCDOC, although Norman still collaborated closely with IBM in developing the Blue Gene supercomputers, he was no longer playing a leading role in these projects.

== Publications ==
- All publications from the INSPIRE-HEP literature database.
