= New York Blue =

2007 supercomputer at Brookhaven National Laboratory

New York Blue is an 18 rack Blue Gene/L and a 2 rack Blue Gene/P massively parallel supercomputer based on the IBM system-on-chip technology. It is in the New York Center for Computational Sciences (NYCCS). The supercomputer is owned by Stony Brook University and is located at Brookhaven National Laboratory in Upton, Long Island, New York. The funds for this machine were provided by the New York state, with the leadership of the NYS Assembly. It began operating on July 15, 2007, when it was the fifth most powerful supercomputer dedicated to general research. According to Stony Brook provost Robert McGrath, it would also rank within the top 10 when including supercomputers available solely for military research. The renovation of the laboratory space holding the machine was supported by the State of New York and the U.S. DOE fund. As of June 2010, the Blue Gene/L was ranked 67th in the top 500 supercomputing rankings. Together with the Computational Center for Nanotechnology Innovations at Rensselaer Polytechnic Institute, New York Blue provides the New York state with more computing power available for general research than any state in the nation.

== Blue Gene/L machine ==
The Blue Gene/L machine consists of 18432 (18 x 1024) dual-processor Compute Nodes (Blue Gene chip) with each Compute Node having two standard 700 MHz PowerPC440 processors (a total of 36864). The two processors (cores) on a chip share 1 GB of DDR memory. The 18 racks are arranged in six (6) rows with three (3) racks each making up a 48x24x16 3D torus. The first rack on the first row (row 0) is designated as R00, while the third one on the sixth row (row 5) is R52. In addition to the Compute Nodes, there are dedicated I/O nodes. Each I/O node provides the dedicated hardware that serves the operating system tasks to a group of compute nodes. The I/O node with the compute nodes that it serves make up a group that is referred to a pset. In New York Blue, the pset ratio (the ratio of I/O nodes to compute nodes) can be one of the following: 1:16, 1:32, 1:64 and 1:128. New York Blue is subdivided into partitions (a.k.a. blocks). Each partition has a specific size (number of nodes), type (Mesh or Torus), and pset ratio (one of the ratios mentioned above). Partitions can be predefined or created by users dynamically according to their job needs. The pset ratio varies throughout the machine, having one of the four pset ratios mentioned above. There are 512 compute nodes on a midplane.

== Blue Gene/P machine ==
In addition to New York Blue/L, there is New York Blue/P which consists of two racks of the Blue Gene/P series. Each BG/P rack contains 1024 850 MHz quad-processor nodes with each node having 2GB of memory. To compile, submit jobs, and analyze results, the user must login to the front end of the Blue Gene/P System. The front end is an IBM p-Series system with Linux as the operating system; so, both the processor architecture and OS are very different from the Blue Gene compute nodes. There are two main limitations for the compute nodes. First is that there are 2048 MB memory per node, 32-bit memory addressing; second, the compute-node kernel is not Linux (limited system calls).

The total peak performance for both Blue Gene/L and Blue Gene/P consists of 103.22 teraflops (trillion floating-point calculations per second), which equals 100 trillion calculations per second - about 10,000 times faster than a personal computer. It may be used in many research areas.

== Climate science research ==
New York Blue Climate Science is a climate science virtual institute to improve understanding of chemical, atmospheric and oceanic processes that affect weather and climate. The New York Blue supercomputer is used by researchers to provide the computational power needed to conduct modelling studies of the fundamental processes that affect storms and ocean circulations, how aerosols and clouds impact climate, and how regional climates are altered by global warming scenarios. The collaborations are led by scientists from the Institute for Terrestrial and Planetary Atmospheres (ITPA) at Stony Brook University, and Atmospheric Sciences Division (ASD) at Brookhaven National Laboratory.

== Other scientific projects ==
=== Nanoscale science and technology ===
New York Blue will enable the complex calculations required to study physical and chemical properties of nanoparticles which will help to foster US energy independence.

=== Computational biology ===
New York Blue will provide interactive models of complex biological systems, including protein and genomic information, to understand the structure and function of enzymes, to design pharmaceutical drugs and vaccines, and to support cost-efficient production of renewable biofuels.

=== Nuclear and high energy physics ===
Funded by the U.S. Department of Energy, the $3 million research project pairs the computing power of the Rensselaer’s Computational Center for Nanotechnology Innovations and New York Blue Gene to create highly detailed computer models of a next-generation nuclear power reactor, which meet the safety criteria, can burn long-lived and highly-radioactive materials, and can operate over a long period of time without using a new fuel.

New York Blue will enhance the computational power for interpreting current data and modelling future experiments at Brookhaven Relativistic Heavy Ion Collider (RHIC), the nation's premiere nuclear physics facility. RHIC will help to better understand the fundamental structure and properties of matter and the evolution of the universe.

=== Astrophysics ===
New York Blue will enhance the understanding of the thermonuclear reactions that generate the energy of the Sun and the other stars of the universe.

== Public access ==
Blue Gene is not a typical parallel computer. It is meant for codes that scale well into hundreds or even thousands of processors. Jobs on New York Blue partitions are scheduled using Loadleveler and are run using mpirun. Industrial and academic researchers from the United States can obtain allocations (in "CPU hours") based on the short outline of the work to be done.
