= Adrian Kaehler =

American computer scientist

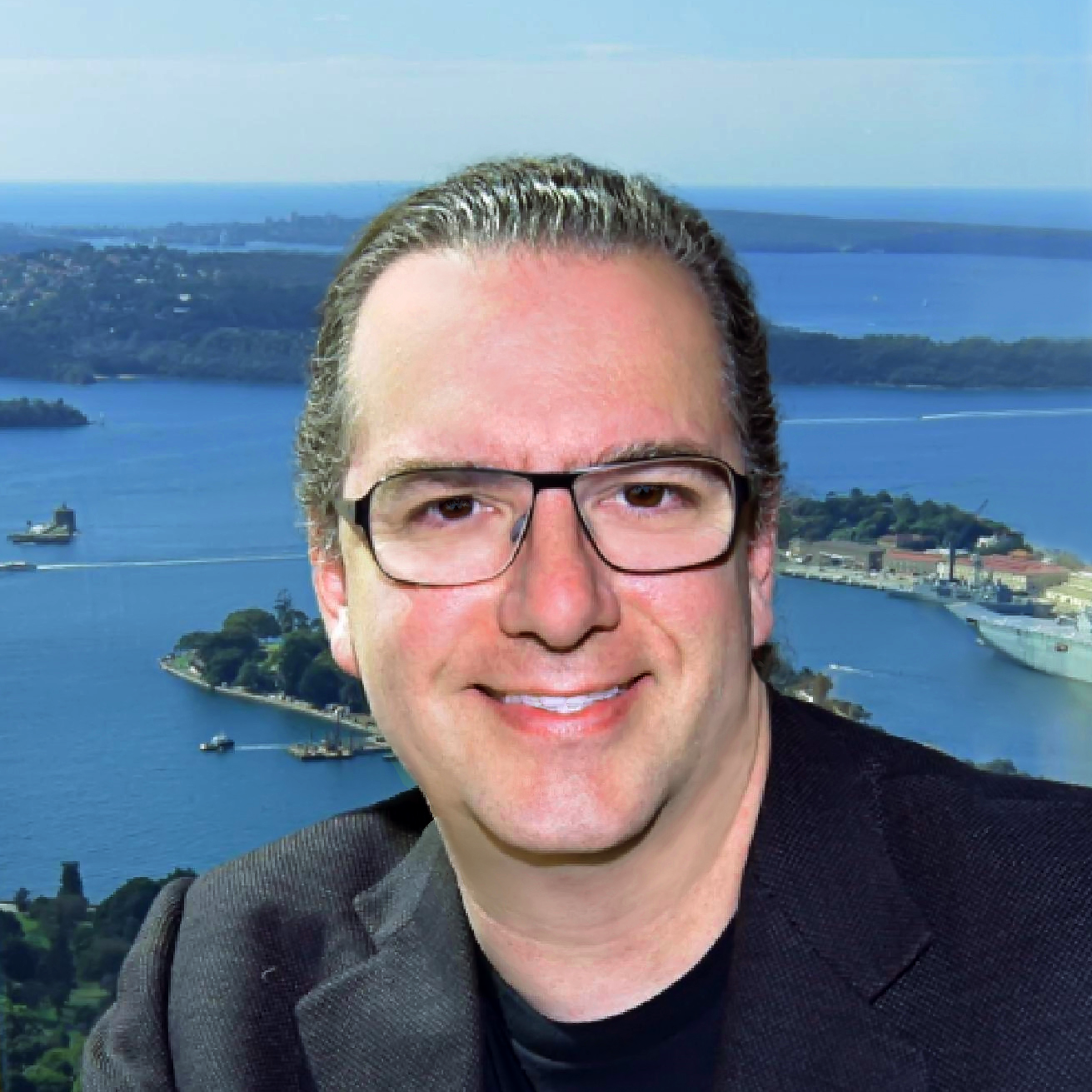
- Kaehler in 2017
- Born: United States
- Education: University of California, Santa Cruz; Columbia University
- Awards: Darpa Grand Challenge First Place (2005); Gordon Bell Prize (1998)
- Scientific career
- Fields: Robotics; Computer Science; Computer Vision; Computer Architecture
- Workplaces: Intel; Applied Minds; Magic Leap
- Doctoral advisor: Norman Christ

Adrian Kaehler is an American computer scientist, engineer, and author. He is best known for his work on the OpenCV Computer Vision library, as well as two books on that library.

== Early life ==
Adrian Kaehler was born in 1973. At the age of 14, he enrolled in UC Santa Cruz, studying mathematics, computer science, and Physics, graduating at 18 with a Bachelor of Arts degree in physics. He received his Ph.D. at Columbia University in 1998 under professor Norman Christ for his work in lattice gauge theory and on the QCDSP supercomputer project.

== QCDSP supercomputer ==
During the time from 1994 through 1998, Dr. Kaehler worked on the QCDSP supercomputer project. This was one of the first Teraflop scale supercomputers ever built. For this, Kaehler, along with Norman Christ, Robert Mawhinney, and Pavlos Vranas were awarded the Gordon Bell Prize in 1998.

== 2005 DARPA Grand Challenge ==
In the 2005 DARPA Grand Challenge, Kaehler was on Stanford's winning team with Sebastian Thrun, Mike Montemerolo, Gary Bradski and others. Kaehler designed the computer vision system that contributed to winning the race. Since 2012, the winning vehicle, called "Stanley", has been on display in the Smithsonian Institution in Washington, DC.

== Learning OpenCV ==
Originally published in 2006, Kaehler's book Learning OpenCV (O'Reilly) serves as an introduction to the library and its use. The book continues to be heavily used by both professionals and students. An updated version of the book, which covers OpenCV 3, was published by O'Reilly Media in 2016.

== Magic Leap ==
Kaehler was Vice President of Special Projects at Magic Leap, Inc., a startup company that raised over $1.4Bn in venture funding from 2014 to 2016. Kaehler left the company in 2016.

== Notable publications ==
Kaehler has publications and patents in a variety of fields:

- 2016 Learning OpenCV 3: Computer Vision in C++ with the OpenCV Library with Gary Bradski, O'Reilly Media.
- 2008 Learning OpenCV: Computer vision with the OpenCV library with Gary Bradski, O'Reilly Media.
- 2006 Stanley: The robot that won the DARPA Grand Challenge, with Sebastian Thrun, Mike Montemerlo, Hendrik Dahlkamp, David Stavens, Andrei Aron, James Diebel, Philip Fong, John Gale, Morgan Halpenny, Gabriel Hoffmann, Kenny Lau, Celia Oakley, Mark Palatucci, Vaughan Pratt, Pascal Stang, Sven Strohband, Cedric Dupont, Lars-Erik Jendrossek, Christian Koelen, Charles Markey, Carlo Rummel, Joe van Niekerk, Eric Jensen, Philippe Alessandrini, Bob Davies, Scott Ettinger, Gary Bradski, Ara Nefian, Pamela Mahoney. Journal of Field Robotics.
- 2006 Self-supervised Monocular Road Detection in Desert Terrain. With Hendrik Dahlkamp, David Stavens, Sebastian Thrun, and Gary Bradski.
- 2005 Learning-based computer vision with intel's open source computer vision library. with Gary Bradski and Vadim Pisarevski.
- 1999 Status of the QCD Project Dong Chen, Ping Chen, Norman H. Christ, George Tamminga Fleming, Alan Gara, Chulwoo Jung, Adrian L. Kaehler, Yu-bing Luo, Catalin I. Malureanu, Robert D. Mawhinney, John Parsons, Cheng-Zhong Sui, Pavlos M. Vranos, Yuri Zhestkov (Columbia U.), Robert G. Edwards, Anthony D. Kennedy (Florida State U.), Sten Hansen (Fermilab), Gregory W. Kilcup (Ohio State U.), Nucl. Phys. Proc. Suppl. 73, 898.
- 1998 Toward the Chiral Limit of QCD: Quenched and Dynamical Domain Wall Fermions, Ping Chen, Norman H. Christ, George Tamminga Fleming, Adrian Kaehler, Catalin Malureanu, Robert Mawhinney, Gabriele Siegert, Cheng-zhong Sui, Yuri Zhestkov (Columbia U.), Pavlos M. Vranas (Illinois U., Urbana), in Vancouver 1998, High energy physics, vol. 2, 1802–1808.
