= Paul William Coteus =

American electrical engineer (1953–2026)

- Born: April 29, 1953; Niles, Illinois, U.S.
- Died: January 24, 2026 (aged 72)
- Education: Columbia University; Bradley University
- Known for: Packaging for high-performance computer systems, BlueGene supercomputer family.
- Scientific career
- Workplaces: IBM Research; University of Colorado Boulder

Paul William Coteus (April 29, 1953 – January 24, 2026) was an American electrical engineer at IBM's T.J. Watson Research Center in Yorktown Heights, New York.

Coteus graduated from Bradley University with a degree in Physics. After receiving a Ph.D. in Physics at Columbia University, he became Assistant Professor of Physics at the University of Colorado, Boulder.

Coteus joined IBM Research in 1988. Throughout his career at IBM, he contributed to over 200 patents and was elected a Master Inventor. He authored many papers in the field of electronic packaging. Google Scholar lists over 400 entries with his name.

Coteus was the Chief Engineer for the development of the BlueGene systems, and in 2012 he was elevated to IBM Fellow for his contributions to the system packaging of the BlueGene family of supercomputers.

He was named a Fellow of the Institute of Electrical and Electronics Engineers (IEEE) in 2013 for his "contributions to packaging for high performance computing systems."

Upon retiring from IBM Research, Coteus became involved in exploring techniques for capturing carbon dioxide towards mitigating climate change.

Coteus died on January 24, 2026, at the age of 72.
