= Sequoia (supercomputer) =

IBM supercomputer at Lawrence Livermore National Laboratory

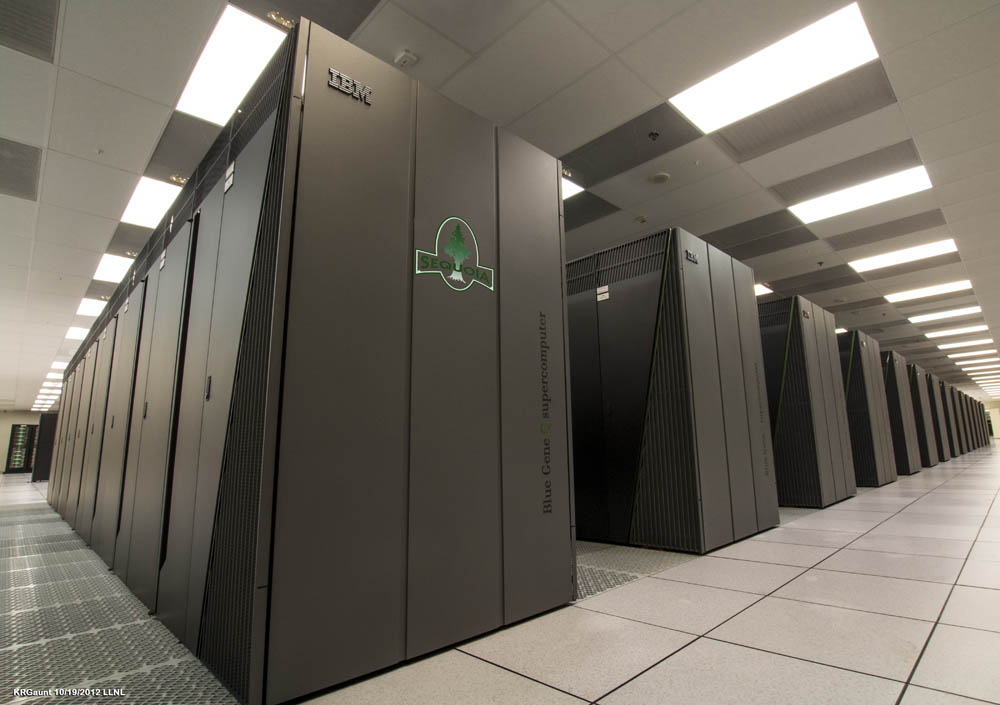
- Operators: LLNL
- Location: Livermore, California, United States
- Power: 7.9 MW
- Operating system: CNK operating system Red Hat Enterprise Linux
- Space: 3,000 square feet (280 m^{2})
- Memory: 1.5 PiB
- Speed: 20.13 PFLOPS
- Cost: US$250 million (undisclosed by IBM); equivalent to $358 million in 2025
- Purpose: Nuclear weapons, astronomy, energy, human genome, and climate change

Sequoia was a petascale Blue Gene/Q supercomputer constructed by IBM for the National Nuclear Security Administration as part of the Advanced Simulation and Computing Program (ASC). It was delivered to the Lawrence Livermore National Laboratory (LLNL) in 2011 and was fully deployed in June 2012. Sequoia was dismantled in 2020, its last position on the top500.org list was #22 in the November 2019 list.

On June 14, 2012, the TOP500 Project Committee announced that Sequoia replaced the K computer as the world's fastest supercomputer, with a LINPACK performance of 17.17 petaflops, 63% faster than the K computer's 10.51 petaflops, having 123% more cores than the K computer's 705,024 cores. Sequoia is also more energy efficient, as it consumes 7.9 MW, 37% less than the K computer's 12.6 MW.

As of November 2017, Sequoia had dropped to sixth place on the TOP500 ranking, while it was at third position on June 17, 2013, behind Tianhe-2 and Titan.

Record-breaking science applications have been run on Sequoia, the first to cross 10 petaflops of sustained performance. The cosmology simulation framework HACC achieved almost 14 petaflops with a 3.6 trillion particle benchmark run, while the Cardioid code, which models the electrophysiology of the human heart, achieved nearly 12 petaflops with a near real-time simulation.

The entire supercomputer ran on Linux, with CNK running on over 98,000 nodes, and Red Hat Enterprise Linux running on 768 I/O nodes that are connected to the Lustre filesystem.

== Dawn prototype ==
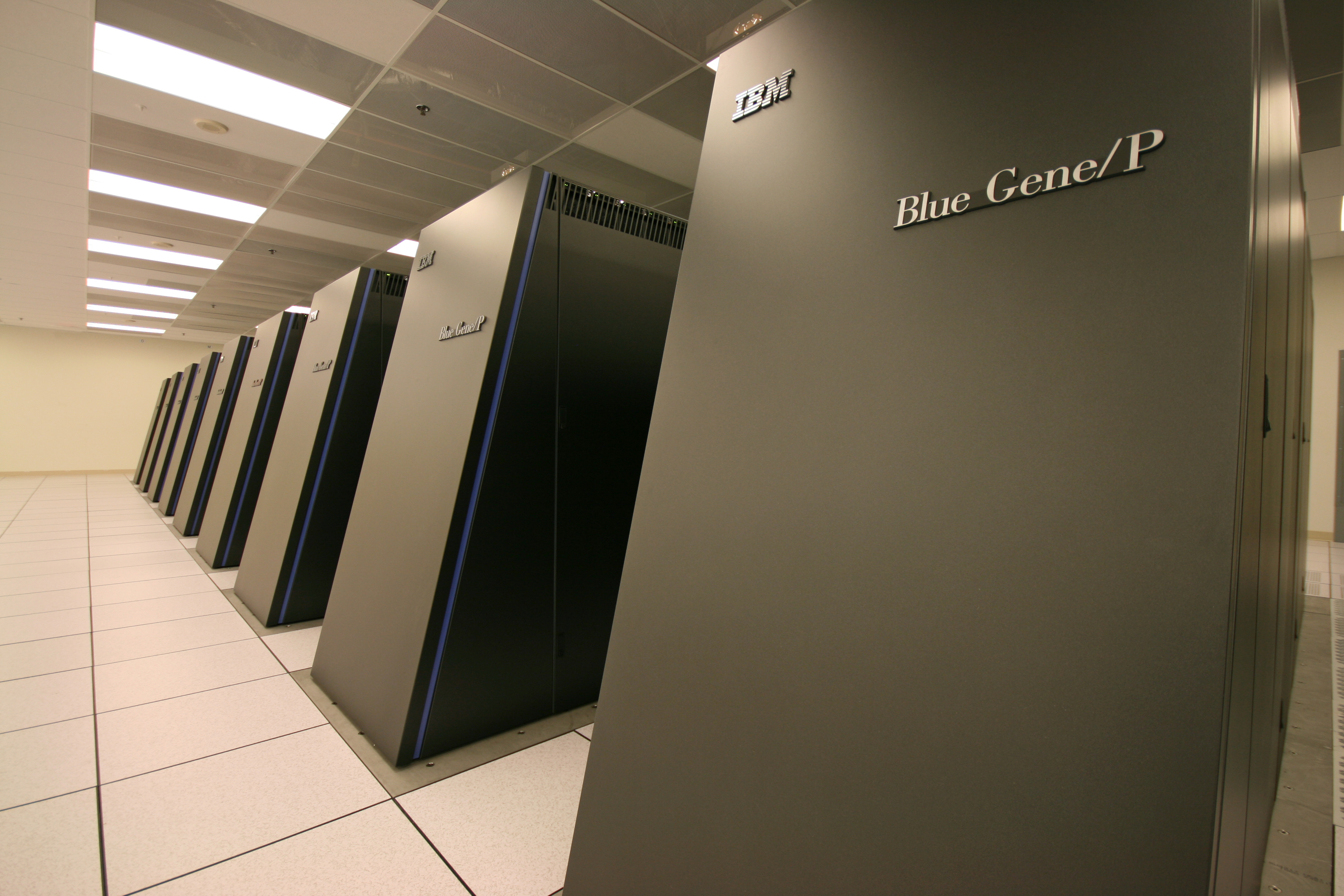
Dawn prototype

IBM built a prototype, called "Dawn", capable of 500 teraflops, using the Blue Gene/P design, to evaluate the Sequoia design. This system was delivered in April 2009 and entered the Top500 list at 9th place in June 2009.

== Purpose ==
Sequoia was used primarily for nuclear weapons simulation, replacing the current Blue Gene/L and ASC Purple supercomputers at Lawrence Livermore National Laboratory. Sequoia was also available for scientific purposes such as astronomy, energy, lattice QCD, study of the human genome, and climate change.

== Design ==
=== Node architecture ===
Sequoia was a Blue Gene/Q design, based on previous Blue Gene designs. It consisted of 96 racks containing 98,304 compute nodes, i.e., 1024 per rack. The compute nodes were 16-core A2 processor chips with 16 GB of DDR3 memory each. Thus, the system contained a total of 96·1024·16 = 1,572,864 processor cores with 1.5 PiB memory. It covered an area of about 3,000 square feet (280 m^{2}). The compute nodes were interconnected in a 5-dimensional torus topology.

=== Job scheduler ===
LLNL used the SLURM job scheduler, also used by the Dawn prototype and China's Tianhe-IA, to manage Sequoia's resources.

=== Filesystem ===
LLNL uses Lustre as the parallel filesystem, and has ported ZFS to Linux as the Lustre OSD (Object Storage Device) to take advantage of the performance and advanced features of the filesystem.

In September 2011, NetApp announced that the DoE had selected the company for 55 PB of storage.

=== Power usage ===
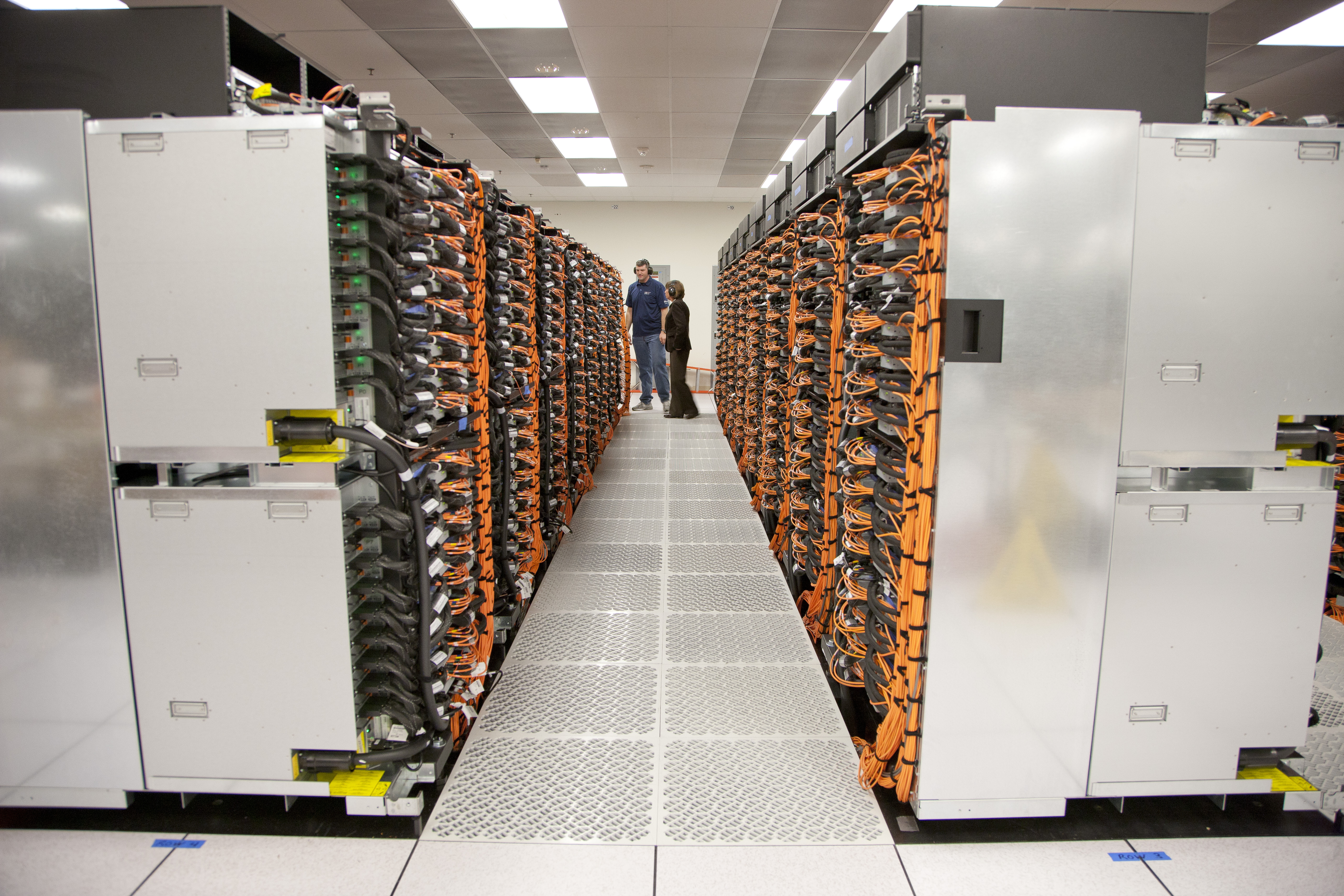

The complete system drew about 7.8 MW of power, but had a unprecedented energy efficiency, performing 2068 Mflops/watt, about 6 times as efficient as Dawn, and more than 2.5 times as efficient as the June 2011 Top 500 leader.

== Application ==
In January 2013, Sequoia set the record for the first supercomputer using more than one million computing cores at a time for a single application. The Stanford Engineering's Center for Turbulence Research (CTR) used it to solve a complex fluid dynamics problem – the prediction of noise generated by a supersonic jet engine.

== See also ==
- IBM Mira
- Blue Gene
- IBM Roadrunner
- TOP500

Records
Preceded by K computer 10.51 petaflops	World's most powerful supercomputer June 2012 – November 2012	Succeeded by Titan; 17.59 petaflops
