= Mira (supercomputer) =

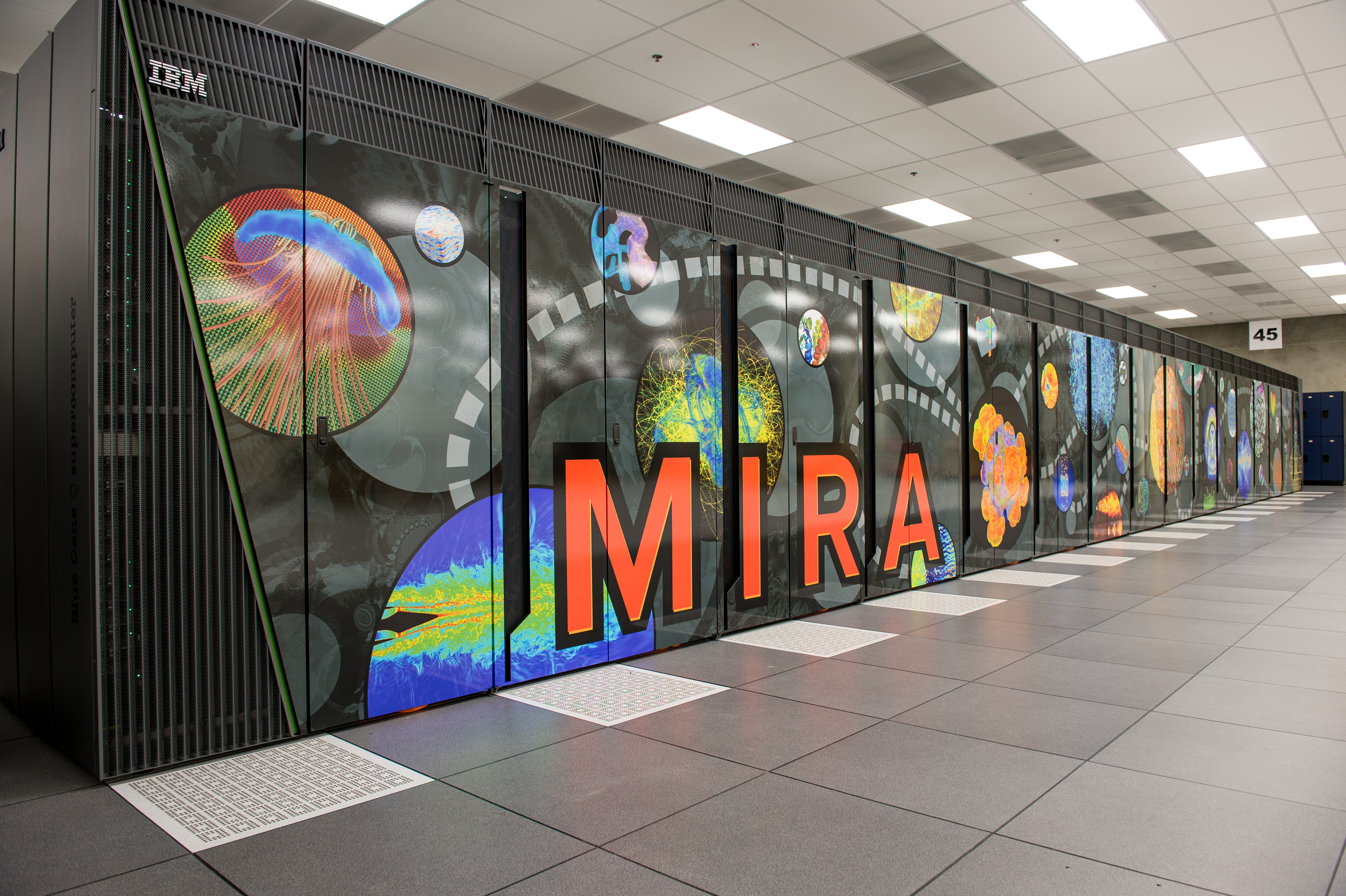
- Operators: USDOE/SC/Argonne National Laboratory
- Location: Argonne National Laboratory
- Architecture: IBM BG/Q; 5D Torus Interconnect configuration 786,432 cores
- Power: 3.9 MW
- Operating system: CNK
- Space: 1,632 sq feet
- Memory: 768 TiB
- Speed: 8.59 petaFLOPS (LINPACK); 10.06 petaFLOPS theoretical peak
- Ranking: TOP500: 22, 2019-11
- Purpose: Cosmology, Astronomy, lattice quantum chromodynamics, Nuclear reactor engineering, Material science, Weather, Climatology, Seismology, Biology, Computational chemistry, Computer science
- Legacy: Ranked 3 on TOP500 when built.
- Website: www.alcf.anl.gov/alcf-resources/mira

Mira is a retired petascale Blue Gene/Q supercomputer. As of November 2017, it is listed on TOP500 as the 11th fastest supercomputer in the world, while it debuted June 2012 in 3rd place. It has a performance of 8.59 petaflops (LINPACK) and consumes 3.9 MW. The supercomputer was constructed by IBM for Argonne National Laboratory's Argonne Leadership Computing Facility with the support of the United States Department of Energy, and partially funded by the National Science Foundation. Mira was used for scientific research, including studies in the fields of material science, climatology, seismology, and computational chemistry. The supercomputer was used initially for sixteen projects selected by the Department of Energy.

The Argonne Leadership Computing Facility, which commissioned the supercomputer, was established by the America COMPETES Act, signed by President Bush in 2007, and President Obama in 2011. The United States' emphasis on supercomputing was seen as a response to China's progress in the field. China's Tianhe-1A, located at the Tianjin National Supercomputer Center, was ranked the most powerful supercomputer in the world from October 2010 to June 2011. Mira is, along with IBM Sequoia and Blue Waters, one of three American petascale supercomputers deployed in 2012. The cost for building Mira has not been released by IBM. Early reports estimated that construction would cost US$50 million, and Argonne National Laboratory announced that Mira was bought using money from a grant of US$180 million. In a press release, IBM marketed the supercomputer's speed, claiming that "if every man, woman and child in the United States performed one calculation each second, it would take them almost a year to do as many calculations as Mira will do in one second".

== One of the applications ==
"Argonne scientists used Mira to identify and improve a new mechanism for eliminating friction, which fed into the development of a hybrid material that exhibited superlubricity at the macroscale for the first time [..] simulating up to 1.2 million atoms for dry environments and up to 10 million atoms for humid environments [..] The researchers used the LAMMPS (Large-scale Atomic/Molecular Massively Parallel Simulator) code to carry out the computationally demanding reactive molecular dynamics simulations. [.. A] team of computational scientists [..] were able to overcome a performance bottleneck with the code's ReaxFF module, an add-on package that was needed to model the chemical reactions occurring in the system. [.. The team] optimized LAMMPS and its implementation of ReaxFF by adding OpenMP threading, replacing MPI point-to-point communication with MPI collectives in key algorithms, and leveraging MPI I/O. Altogether, these enhancements allowed the code to perform twice as fast as before."

"The research team is in the process of seeking a patent for the hybrid material, which could potentially be used for applications in dry environments, such as computer hard drives, wind turbine gears, and mechanical rotating seals for microelectromechanical and nanoelectromechanical systems."
