= Yuefan Deng =

Chinese mathematician

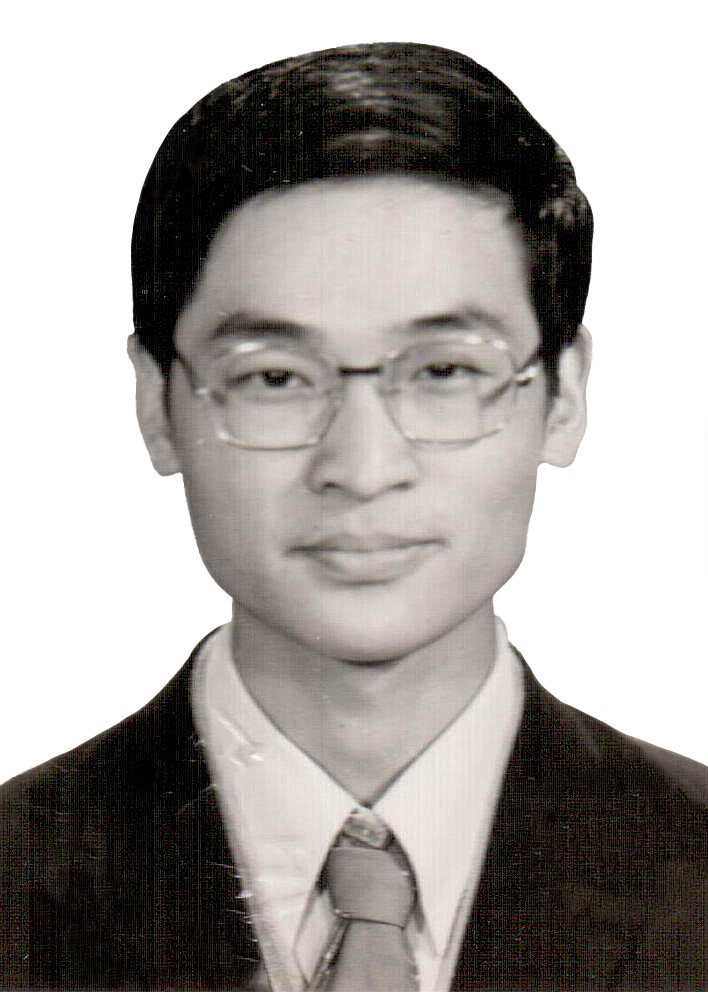
- Deng in 1983
- Born: December 26, 1962 (age 63); Hubei Province, China
- Education: Nankai University (BS); Columbia University (MA, MPhil, PhD)
- Scientific career
- Fields: Theoretical physics Applied mathematics
- Workplaces: Stony Brook University; Hong Kong University of Science and Technology; Columbia University; National University of Singapore; New York University
- Doctoral advisor: Norman H. Christ

Yuefan Deng (Y. F. Deng, Chinese: 邓越凡; pinyin: Dèng Yuèfán, born December 1962) is a Chinese theoretical physicist and computational scientist. He is a professor of applied mathematics and statistics at Stony Brook University. His research centers on developing parallel computing and machine learning algorithms for supercomputers, with a particular focus on modeling human platelet dynamics and optimizing Markov Chain Monte Carlo techniques for various applications.

Deng's publications comprise journal articles and textbooks including Lectures, Problems and Solutions for Ordinary Differential Equations, Introductory Partial Differential Equations and Applied Parallel Computing. He received 1983 Nankai University Distinguished Award, the 2015-2016 Stony Brook University Engineering Dean’s Award and the 2016 State University of New York Chancellor's Award for Excellence in Teaching.

== Education ==
Deng graduated with a B.S. in physics from Nankai University in 1983. Through the CUSPEA program launched by T. D. Lee, he pursued graduate studies at Columbia University, where he earned an M.A. in physics in 1985, an M.Phil. in 1986, and a Ph.D. in 1989 in theoretical physics under Norman H. Christ. After completing his doctorate, he received his postdoctoral training supervised by James Glimm in Applied Mathematics at the Courant Institute of Mathematical Sciences, New York University, in 1989.

== Career ==
Deng began his academic career at Stony Brook University in 1990 initially as a Visiting Assistant Professor, later becoming Assistant Professor in 1991, Associate Professor in 1994 and has been serving as Professor of Applied Mathematics since 1999.

Deng chaired the International Conference in Scientific Computing (2004) and co-chaired the Supercomputing Frontiers Conference (2015), while also being a Guest Editor for the International Journal of Supercomputing Frontiers and Innovations (2015).

== Research ==
Deng has contributed to the field of computational sciences by focusing on parallel computing, Monte Carlo methods, molecular dynamics, and data science.

== Works ==
Deng was involved in the development of a system for dynamic management of hosted services, where server performance is monitored and servers are automatically reallocated between customer accounts based on usage demands and service agreements. Building upon this, he created a system that dynamically allocates incoming client requests to servers by analyzing request attributes and server capabilities, optimizing distribution based on metrics in a relational database. With his former doctoral students, he presented methods for enhancing parallel processing and storage systems: one by using mixed torus and hypercube tensor expansion to improve bandwidth and scalability, and another by creating interlaced bypass torus (iBT) networks to add bypass links for better interconnection in parallel computers and storage systems. Furthermore, he introduced an ultra-scalable supercomputer with MPU architecture designed for high TFLOPS/PFLOPS performance, featuring advanced interconnect topologies, routing strategies, and modular hardware for efficient parallel processing and communication.

Using Monte Carlo calculations on lattices with large spatial volumes, Deng investigated the SU(3) deconfining phase transition and revealed that the transition is more weakly first-order than previously believed. He also utilized hydrogen bond modeling and Monte Carlo methods to predict protein-DNA binding specificity and refine base pair predictions in protein-DNA complexes. Later, alongside King-Wai Chu and John Reinitz, he tested a new parallel optimization method based on simulated annealing to analyze gene interaction networks by optimizing parameters for distributed-memory architectures. He then devised a multiscale particle-based model to simulate platelet interactions with shear stresses in blood flow, improving predictions of platelet activation by combining molecular dynamics with macroscopic fluid dynamics.

Deng's work also includes textbooks on parallel commuting and differential equations. In 2017, he published the second edition of Lectures, Problems and Solutions for Ordinary Differential Equations. In a review for Zentralblatt MATH, Svitlana Rogovchenko remarked, "The book can be warmly recommended as a good source of problems both for the lecturer and for the students’ independent study."

Deng co-authored the Chinese Scientists Encyclopedia entry on Chen Ning Yang, whom he wrote several papers with.

== Awards and honors ==
- 1982 - Nankai University Excellent Student Award, Nankai University
- 2015-2016 – Dean's Award for Excellence in Teaching, Stony Brook University
- 2016 – Chancellor's Award for Excellence in Teaching, State University of New York

== Bibliography ==
=== Books ===
- Applied Parallel Computing (2013) ISBN 978-981-4307-60-4
- Introductory Partial Differential Equations (2015) ISBN 978-3-659-75354-1
- Lectures, Problems and Solutions for Ordinary Differential Equations (2015) ISBN 978-981-4632-24-9
- Mathematical Sciences, Technology, and Economic Competitiveness (Chinese translation), by James Glimm etc., translated by Yuefan Deng, (1992), ISBN 978-7-310-00483-6

=== Selected articles ===
- Brown, F. R., Christ, N. H., Deng, Y., Gao, M., & Woch, T. J. (1988). Nature of the deconfining phase transition in SU (3) lattice gauge theory. Physical review letters, 61(18), 2058.
- Chu, K. W., Deng, Y., & Reinitz, J. (1999). Parallel simulated annealing by mixing of states. Journal of Computational Physics, 148(2), 646-662.
- Deng, Y., Peierls, R. F., & Rivera, C. (2000). An adaptive load balancing method for parallel molecular dynamics simulations. Journal of Computational Physics, 161(1), 250-263.
- Yamaguchi, T., Ishikawa, T., Imai, Y., Matsuki, N., Xenos, M., Deng, Y., & Bluestein, D. (2010). Particle-Based Methods for Multiscale Modeling of Blood Flow in the Circulation and in Devices: Challenges and Future Directions: Sixth International Bio-Fluid Mechanics Symposium and Workshop March 28–30, 2008 Pasadena, California. Annals of biomedical engineering, 38, 1225-1235.
- Zhang, P., Gao, C., Zhang, N., Slepian, M. J., Deng, Y., & Bluestein, D. (2014). Multiscale particle-based modeling of flowing platelets in blood plasma using dissipative particle dynamics and coarse grained molecular dynamics. Cellular and molecular bioengineering, 7, 552-574.
- Tuna, R., Yi, W., Crespo Cruz, E., Romero, J. P., Ren, Y., Guan, J., ... & Sheriff, J. (2024). Platelet Biorheology and Mechanobiology in Thrombosis and Hemostasis: Perspectives from Multiscale Computation. International Journal of Molecular Sciences, 25(9), 4800.
