= Shaheen (supercomputer) =

Shaheen is the name of a series of supercomputers owned and operated by King Abdullah University of Science and Technology (KAUST), Saudi Arabia. Shaheen is named after the Peregrine Falcon. The most recent model, Shaheen III, is the largest and most powerful supercomputer in the Middle East.

== Shaheen I ==
The first generation of Shaheen (2009-2015) was an IBM Blue Gene/P. It was originally built at IBM's Thomas J. Watson Research Center in Yorktown Heights, New York, and moved to KAUST in mid-2009. The computer was created by Majid Alghaslan while he was working for King Abdullah University of Science and Technology.

The first generation of Shaheen included the following functional elements:

- 16 racks of Blue Gene/P, having a peak performance of 222 Teraflops
- 164 IBM IBM System x 3550 Xeon nodes, having a peak performance of 12 Teraflops

=== Performance ===
Shaheen I's performance and computing capabilities included:

- 65,536 independent processing cores.
- 10 Gbit/s access to world's academic and research networks.

The file system and Spectra Logic TFinity tape system were mounted across both the Blue Gene system and the Linux cluster. All elements of the system were connected together on a common network backbone that is accessible from all campus buildings. The systems were also accessible from the Internet.

== Shaheen II ==
The second generation of Shaheen was brought into service in 2015. It consists of a 36-cabinet XC40 supercomputer.

As of June 2022 the computer is ranked the 97th fastest supercomputer in the world, with a Rmax of 5.54 petaFLOPS.

== Services ==
The Shaheen system at KAUST Supercomputing Laboratory (KSL) is available to help KAUST users and projects, to provide training and advice, to develop and deploy applications, to provide consultation on best practices and to provide collaboration support as needed.

KAUST Faculty will have access to:

- General support for Shaheen facility use, including usage scheduling of Shaheen and peripheral systems
- High-performance computing support for "Grand Challenges" by collaboration with the Center to deliver fundamental breakthroughs in specific areas of research
- Collaboration to provide high-performance computing applications, middleware, library, algorithm support and enablement services
- Applications Enablement where users can task the CDCR to develop, enable, port and scale key applications
- High-performance Computing Program Best Practice Management techniques
- Participation with KAUST researchers in external projects
- Training on high-performance computing systems management, programming, applications tuning and algorithms

== Research topics ==
KAUST, using the Shaheen systems, will focus on four specific research thrusts:

- Resources, energy, and environment
- Biosciences and bioengineering
- Materials science and engineering
- Applied mathematics and computational science

Data sets for this research will be unique in that they will come from the Saudi Arabia region, focusing on areas such as oil and gas reserves, Red Sea data, and other areas distinctive to KAUST.

== Restrictions ==
Although KAUST does not support any kind of discrimination against any students or faculty based on religion, sex, or national origin, IBM and Cray have to comply with US Export regulations governing exporting high-end computing technology. As per the regulations a restriction had to be made to deny nationals of Syria, Iran, Sudan, Cuba, and North Korea from access to the supercomputer.

== Institutional partners ==
The Shaheen system at KAUST is made possible through a joint collaboration between the Cray and KAUST. In addition to IBM and Cray, KSL has partnered with the following partner research institutions and organizations:

- The Oxford Center for Collaborative Applied Mathematics (OCCAM) at Oxford University
- Massachusetts Institute of Technology (MIT)
- Imperial College London
- Hong Kong University of Science and Technology
- Woods Hole Oceanographic Institution
- Institut Français du Pétrole
- National University of Singapore
- American University in Cairo
- Technical University of Munich
- GE Global Research
- King Abdulaziz City for Science & Technology
- King Fahd University of Petroleum and Minerals
- Saudi Aramco
- Wipro Arabia
- Indian Institute of Technology Kanpur

== See also ==
- Blue Gene
- King Abdullah University of Science and Technology
- Cray XC40
