= Gary Bradski =

American computer scientist

- Born: United States
- Education: University of California at Berkeley; Boston University
- Awards: Darpa Grand Challenge First Place (2005)
- Scientific career
- Fields: Computer Science; Computer Vision
- Workplaces: Intel; Willow Garage; Industrial Perception; Magic Leap

Gary Bradski is an American scientist, engineer, entrepreneur, and author. He co-founded Industrial Perception, a company that developed perception applications for industrial robotic application (since acquired by Google in 2012) and has worked on the OpenCV Computer Vision library, as well as published a book on that library.

== Education ==
- Ph.D., Cognitive and Neural Systems (mathematical modeling of biological perception) May, 1994, Boston University Center for Adaptive Systems.
- BS degree in EECS from U.C. Berkeley

== The OpenCV Library ==
The OpenCV Library is a Computer Vision Software Library.

== Learning OpenCV ==
Originally published in 2006, the book Learning OpenCV (O'Reilly) serves as an introduction to the library and its use. An updated version of the book], which covers OpenCV 3, was published by O'Reilly Media in 2016.

== Publications ==
Bradski has published a wide variety of articles in computer science on the topics of computer vision and optimization. The following are his most highly cited works:

- 2016 Learning OpenCV 3: Computer Vision in C++ with the OpenCV Library with Adrian Kaehler, O'Reilly Media.
- 2008 Learning OpenCV: Computer vision with the OpenCV library with Adrian Kaehler, O'Reilly Media.
- 2007 Map-reduce for machine learning on multicore, with Cheng Chu, Sang Kyun Kim, Yi-An Lin, YuanYuan Yu, Andrew Ng, Kunle Olukotun. Advances in neural information processing systems
- 2006 Stanley: The robot that won the DARPA Grand Challenge, with Sebastian Thrun, Mike Montemerlo, Hendrik Dahlkamp, David Stavens, Andrei Aron, James Diebel, Philip Fong, John Gale, Morgan Halpenny, Gabriel Hoffmann, Kenny Lau, Celia Oakley, Mark Palatucci, Vaughan Pratt, Pascal Stang, Sven Strohband, Cedric Dupont, Lars‐Erik Jendrossek, Christian Koelen, Charles Markey, Carlo Rummel, Joe van Niekerk, Eric Jensen, Philippe Alessandrini, Bob Davies, Scott Ettinger, Adrian Kaehler, Ara Nefian, Pamela Mahoney. Journal of Field Robotics
- 2000 The OpenCV Library, Dr. Dobb's Journal
- 1998 Computer vision face tracking for use in a perceptual user interface
