= Australian Centre for Plant Functional Genomics =

Australian research organisation

The Australian Centre for Plant Functional Genomics (ACPFG) is a research organisation focusing on improving the resistance of wheat and barley to hostile environmental conditions, using functional genomics technologies.

Scientists at the ACPFG are focusing on stresses that impact agriculture in Australia, including drought, salinity, high or low temperatures and mineral deficiencies or toxicities. These stresses, known as abiotic stresses, are a major cause of cereal crop yield and quality loss throughout the world.

The ACPFG was established in December 2002 after being granted $27 million from the Australian Research Council (ARC), the Grains Research and Development Corporation (GRDC) and the South Australian Government.

It also had support of $30 million from the University of Adelaide, The University of Melbourne, the Victorian Department of Primary Industries and the University of Queensland.

ACPFG as a research organisation has an unusual structure because it is a company, but its shareholders are the research organisations and governments that fund it.

In the second funding cycle the University of South Australia became a shareholder, increasing ACPFG’s focus on bioinformatics, which is the focus of ACPFG researchers in Queensland.

Most ACPFG researchers are based on the University of Adelaide’s Waite Campus in the Plant Genomics Centre.

As well as the core research programs focused on environmental stresses, ACPFG researchers work with other organisations including CSIRO and the Consultative Group on International Agricultural Research, on nutritional focuses such as beta-glucan and iron biofortification.

Though research outcomes are focused on wheat and barley for Australian farmers, model species such as arabidopsis and rice are often used in ACPFG research. Researchers also explore the genetic diversity of less commercially viable plant varieties, such as those originating from the Fertile Crescent.
