= IBM Blue Gene =

Series of supercomputers by IBM

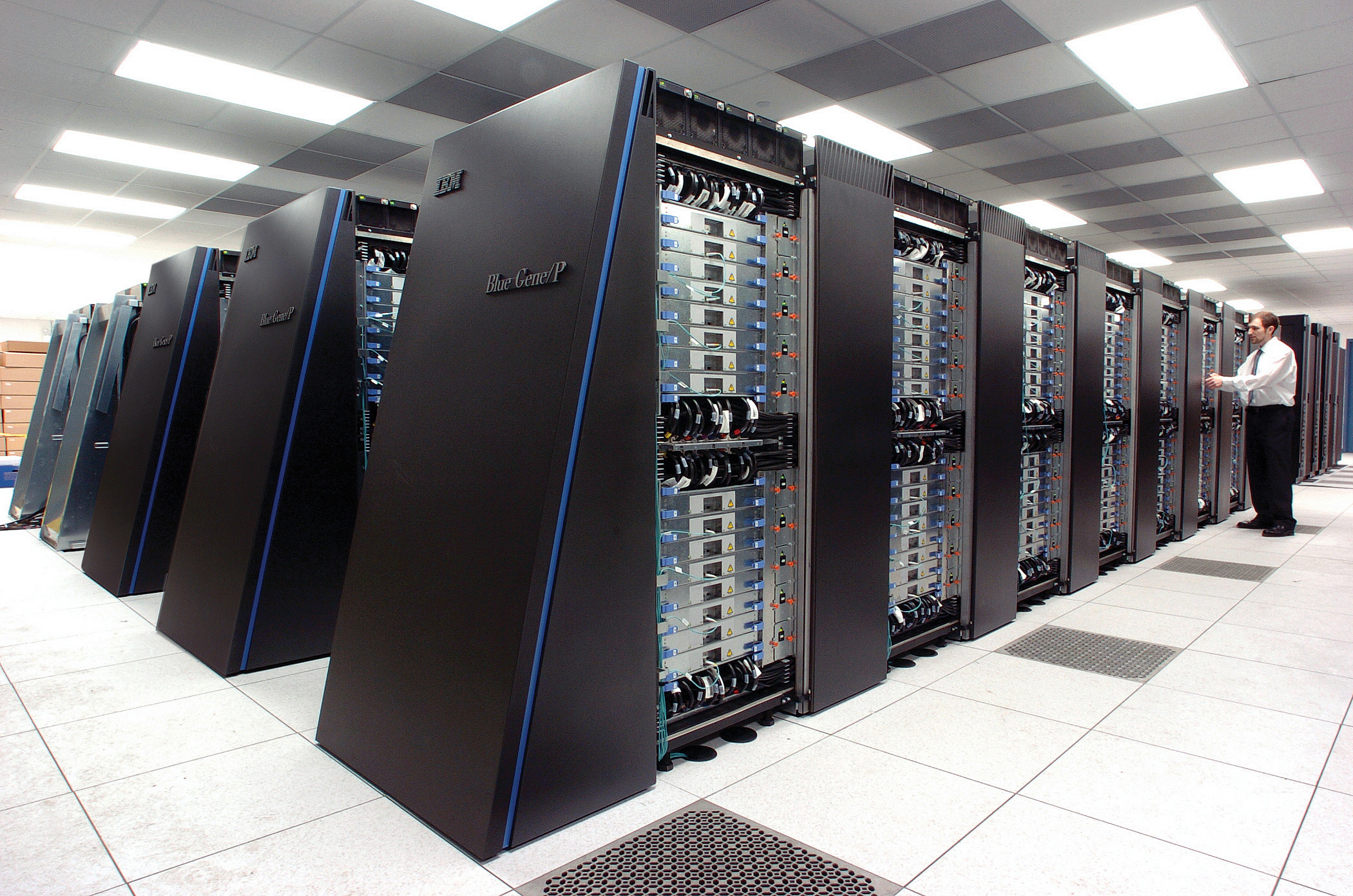
- A Blue Gene/P supercomputer at Argonne National Laboratory
- Developer: IBM
- Type: Supercomputer platform
- Released: BG/L: February 1999; BG/P: June 2007; BG/Q: Nov 2011
- Discontinued: 2015
- CPU: BG/L: PowerPC 440; BG/P: PowerPC 450; BG/Q: PowerPC A2
- Predecessor: IBM RS/6000 SP; QCDOC
- Successor: Summit, Sierra

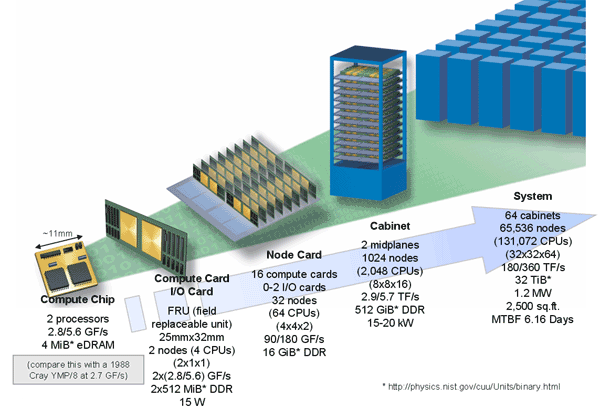
Hierarchy of Blue Gene processing units

Blue Gene was an IBM project aimed at designing supercomputers that can reach operating speeds in the petaFLOPS (PFLOPS) range, with relatively low power consumption.

The project created three generations of supercomputers, Blue Gene/L, Blue Gene/P, and Blue Gene/Q. During their deployment, Blue Gene systems often led the TOP500 and Green500 rankings of the most powerful and most power-efficient supercomputers, respectively. Blue Gene systems have also consistently scored top positions in the Graph500 list. The project was awarded the 2009 National Medal of Technology and Innovation.

After Blue Gene/Q, IBM focused its supercomputer efforts on the OpenPower platform, using accelerators such as FPGAs and GPUs to address the diminishing returns of Moore's law.

== History ==
A video presentation of the history and technology of the Blue Gene project was given at the Supercomputing 2020 conference.

In December 1999, IBM announced a US$100 million research initiative for a five-year effort to build a massively parallel computer, to be applied to the study of biomolecular phenomena such as protein folding. The research and development was pursued by a large multi-disciplinary team at the IBM T. J. Watson Research Center, initially led by William R. Pulleyblank. The project had two main goals: to advance understanding of the mechanisms behind protein folding via large-scale simulation, and to explore novel ideas in massively parallel machine architecture and software. Major areas of investigation included: how to use this novel platform to effectively meet its scientific goals, how to make such massively parallel machines more usable, and how to achieve performance targets at a reasonable cost, through novel machine architectures.

The initial design for Blue Gene was based on an early version of the Cyclops64 architecture, designed by Monty Denneau. In parallel, Alan Gara had started working on an extension of the QCDOC architecture into a more general-purpose supercomputer. The US Department of Energy started funding the development of this system and it became known as Blue Gene/L (L for Light). Development of the original Blue Gene architecture continued under the name Blue Gene/C (C for Cyclops) and, later, Cyclops64.

Architecture and chip logic design for the Blue Gene systems was done at the IBM T. J. Watson Research Center, chip design was completed and chips were manufactured by IBM Microelectronics, and the systems were built at IBM Rochester, MN. Alan Gara was the Chief Architect and Paul Coteus was the Chief Engineer.

In November 2004 a 16-rack system, with each rack holding 1,024 compute nodes, achieved first place in the TOP500 list, with a LINPACK benchmarks performance of 70.72 TFLOPS. It thereby overtook NEC's Earth Simulator, which had held the title of the fastest computer in the world since 2002. From 2004 through 2007 the Blue Gene/L installation at LLNL gradually expanded to 104 racks, achieving 478 TFLOPS Linpack and 596 TFLOPS peak. The LLNL BlueGene/L installation held the first position in the TOP500 list for 3.5 years, until in June 2008 it was overtaken by IBM's Cell-based Roadrunner system at Los Alamos National Laboratory, which was the first system to surpass the 1 PetaFLOPS mark.

While the LLNL installation was the largest Blue Gene/L installation, many smaller installations followed. The November 2006 TOP500 list showed 27 computers with the eServer Blue Gene Solution architecture. For example, three racks of Blue Gene/L were housed at the San Diego Supercomputer Center.

While the TOP500 measures performance on a single benchmark application, Linpack, Blue Gene/L also set records for performance on a wider set of applications. Blue Gene/L was the first supercomputer ever to run over 100 TFLOPS sustained on a real-world application, namely a three-dimensional molecular dynamics code (ddcMD), simulating solidification (nucleation and growth processes) of molten metal under high pressure and temperature conditions. This achievement won the 2005 Gordon Bell Prize.

In June 2006, NNSA and IBM announced that Blue Gene/L achieved 207.3 TFLOPS on a quantum chemical application (Qbox). At Supercomputing 2006, Blue Gene/L was awarded the winning prize in all HPC Challenge Classes of awards. In 2007, a team from the IBM Almaden Research Center and the University of Nevada ran an artificial neural network almost half as complex as the brain of a mouse for the equivalent of a second (the network was run at 1/10 of normal speed for 10 seconds).

=== The name ===
The name Blue Gene comes from what it was originally designed to do, help biologists understand the processes of protein folding and gene development. "Blue" is a traditional moniker that IBM uses for many of its products and the company itself. The original Blue Gene design was renamed "Blue Gene/C" and eventually Cyclops64. The "L" in Blue Gene/L comes from "Light" as that design's original name was "Blue Light". The "P" version was designed to be a petascale design. "Q" is just the letter after "P".

=== Major features ===
The Blue Gene/L supercomputer was unique in the following aspects:

- Trading the speed of processors for lower power consumption. Blue Gene/L used low frequency and low power embedded PowerPC cores with floating-point accelerators. While the performance of each chip was relatively low, the system could achieve better power efficiency for applications that could use large numbers of nodes.
- Dual processors per node with two working modes: co-processor mode where one processor handles computation and the other handles communication; and virtual-node mode, where both processors are available to run user code, but the processors share both the computation and the communication load.
- System-on-a-chip design. Components were embedded on a single chip for each node, with the exception of 512 MB external DRAM.
- A large number of nodes (scalable in increments of 1024 up to at least 65,536).
- Three-dimensional torus interconnect with auxiliary networks for global communications (broadcast and reductions), I/O, and management.
- Lightweight OS per node for minimum system overhead (system noise).

=== Architecture ===
The Blue Gene/L architecture was an evolution of the QCDSP and QCDOC architectures. Each Blue Gene/L Compute or I/O node was a single ASIC with associated DRAM memory chips. The ASIC integrated two 700 MHz PowerPC 440 embedded processors, each with a double-pipeline-double-precision Floating-Point Unit (FPU), a cache sub-system with built-in DRAM controller and the logic to support multiple communication sub-systems. The dual FPUs gave each Blue Gene/L node a theoretical peak performance of 5.6 GFLOPS (gigaFLOPS). The two CPUs were not cache coherent with one another.

Compute nodes were packaged two per compute card, with 16 compute cards (thus 32 nodes) plus up to 2 I/O nodes per node board. A cabinet/rack contained 32 node boards. By the integration of all essential sub-systems on a single chip, and the use of low-power logic, each Compute or I/O node dissipated about 17 watts (including DRAMs). The low power per node allowed aggressive packaging of up to 1024 compute nodes, plus additional I/O nodes, in a standard 19-inch rack, within reasonable limits on electrical power supply and air cooling. The system performance metrics, in terms of FLOPS per watt, FLOPS per m^{2} of floorspace and FLOPS per unit cost, allowed scaling up to very high performance. With so many nodes, component failures were inevitable. The system was able to electrically isolate faulty components, down to a granularity of half a rack (512 compute nodes), to allow the machine to continue to run.

Each Blue Gene/L node was attached to three parallel communications networks: a 3D toroidal network for peer-to-peer communication between compute nodes, a collective network for collective communication (broadcasts and reduce operations), and a global interrupt network for fast barriers. The I/O nodes, which run the Linux operating system, provided communication to storage and external hosts via an Ethernet network. The I/O nodes handled filesystem operations on behalf of the compute nodes. A separate and private Ethernet management network provided access to any node for configuration, booting and diagnostics.

To allow multiple programs to run concurrently, a Blue Gene/L system could be partitioned into electronically isolated sets of nodes. The number of nodes in a partition had to be a positive integer power of 2, with at least 2^{5} = 32 nodes. To run a program on Blue Gene/L, a partition of the computer was first to be reserved. The program was then loaded and run on all the nodes within the partition, and no other program could access nodes within the partition while it was in use. Upon completion, the partition nodes were released for future programs to use.

Blue Gene/L compute nodes used a minimal operating system supporting a single user program. Only a subset of POSIX calls was supported, and only one process could run at a time on a node in co-processor mode—or one process per CPU in virtual mode. Programmers needed to implement green threads in order to simulate local concurrency. Application development was usually performed in C, C++, or Fortran using MPI for communication. However, some scripting languages such as Ruby and Python have been ported to the compute nodes.

IBM published BlueMatter, the application developed to exercise Blue Gene/L, as open source. This serves to document how the torus and collective interfaces were used by applications, and may serve as a base for others to exercise the current generation of supercomputers.

== Blue Gene/P ==
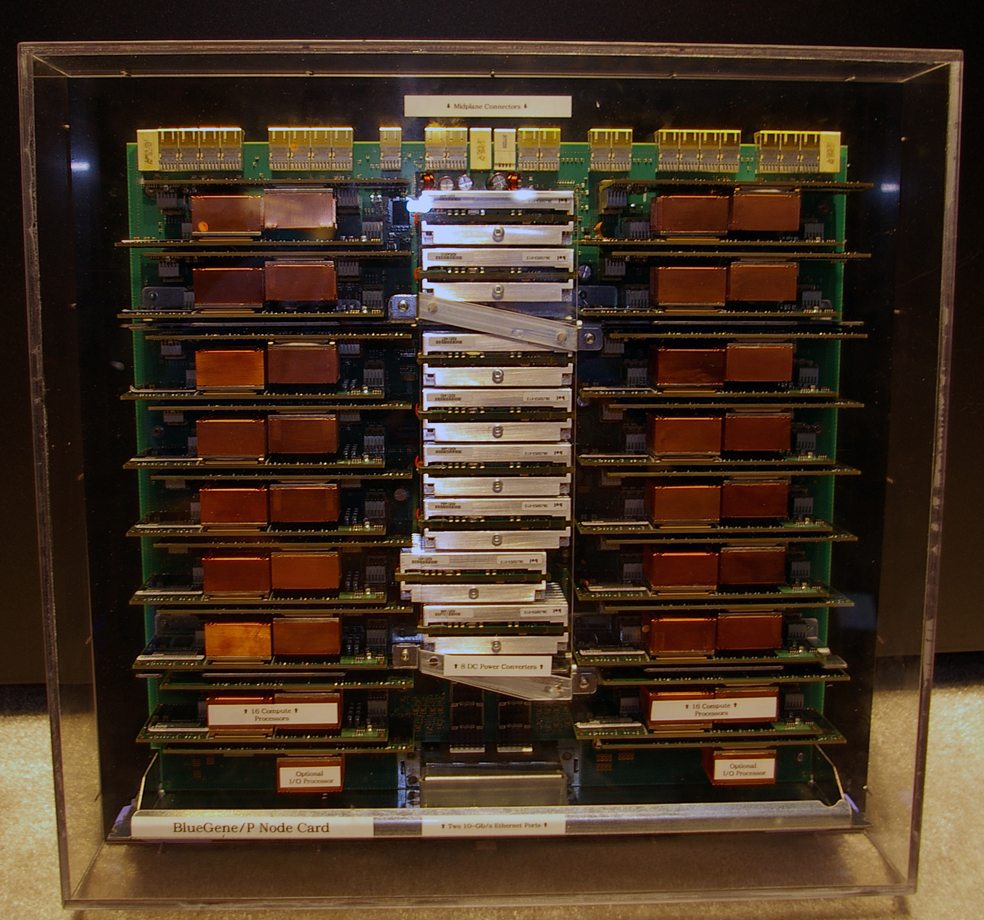
A Blue Gene/P node card

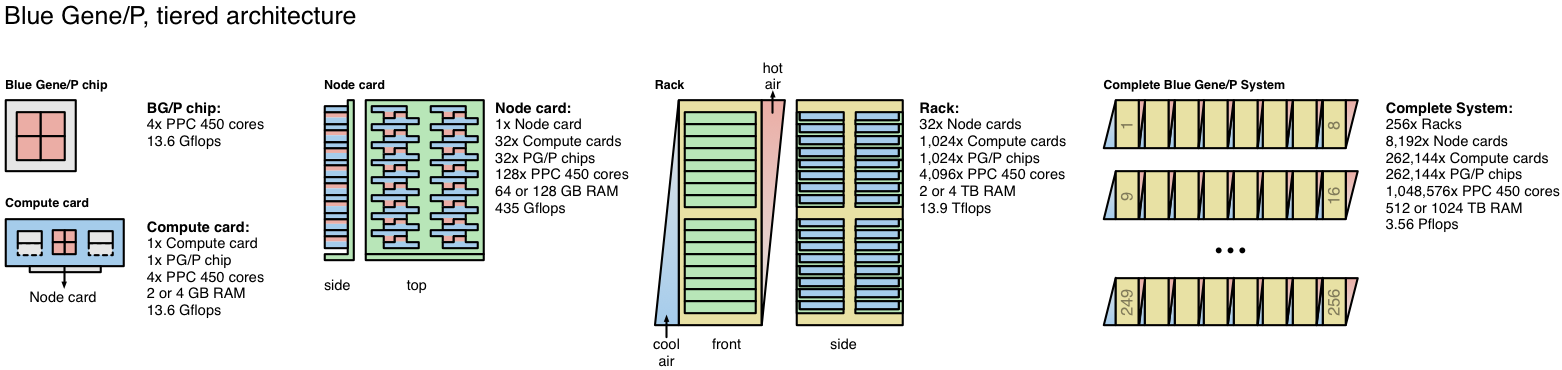
A schematic overview of a Blue Gene/P supercomputer

In June 2007, IBM unveiled Blue Gene/P, the second generation of the Blue Gene series of supercomputers and designed through a collaboration that included IBM, LLNL, and Argonne National Laboratory's Leadership Computing Facility.

=== Design ===
The design of Blue Gene/P is a technology evolution from Blue Gene/L. Each Blue Gene/P Compute chip contains four PowerPC 450 processor cores, running at 850 MHz. The cores are cache coherent and the chip can operate as a 4-way symmetric multiprocessor (SMP). The memory subsystem on the chip consists of small private L2 caches, a central shared 8 MB L3 cache, and dual DDR2 memory controllers. The chip also integrates the logic for node-to-node communication, using the same network topologies as Blue Gene/L, but at more than twice the bandwidth. A compute card contains a Blue Gene/P chip with 2 or 4 GB DRAM, comprising a "compute node". A single compute node has a peak performance of 13.6 GFLOPS. 32 Compute cards are plugged into an air-cooled node board. A rack contains 32 node boards (thus 1024 nodes, 4096 processor cores). By using many small, low-power, densely packaged chips, Blue Gene/P exceeded the power efficiency of other supercomputers of its generation, and at 371 MFLOPS/W Blue Gene/P installations ranked at or near the top of the Green500 lists in 2007–2008.

=== Installations ===
The following is an incomplete list of Blue Gene/P installations. Per November 2009, the TOP500 list contained 15 Blue Gene/P installations of 2-racks (2048 nodes, 8192 processor cores, 23.86 TFLOPS Linpack) and larger.

- In September 2007, the worldwide first IBM Blue Gene/P system (2 racks) was installed at Rechenzentrum Garching (nowadays called "MPCDF") and extended to four racks in 2008, with a peak performance of 56 TFLOPS.
- On November 12, 2007, the first Blue Gene/P installation, JUGENE, with 16 racks (16,384 nodes, 65,536 processors) was running at Forschungszentrum Jülich in Germany with a performance of 167 TFLOPS. When inaugurated it was the fastest supercomputer in Europe and the sixth fastest in the world. In 2009, JUGENE was upgraded to 72 racks (73,728 nodes, 294,912 processor cores) with 144 terabytes of memory and 6 petabytes of storage, and achieved a peak performance of 1 PetaFLOPS. This configuration incorporated new air-to-water heat exchangers between the racks, reducing the cooling cost substantially. JUGENE was shut down in July 2012 and replaced by the Blue Gene/Q system JUQUEEN.
- The 40-rack (40960 nodes, 163840 processor cores) "Intrepid" system at Argonne National Laboratory was ranked #3 on the June 2008 Top 500 list. The Intrepid system is one of the major resources of the INCITE program, in which processor hours are awarded to "grand challenge" science and engineering projects in a peer-reviewed competition.
- Lawrence Livermore National Laboratory installed a 36-rack Blue Gene/P installation, "Dawn", in 2009.
- The King Abdullah University of Science and Technology (KAUST) installed a 16-rack Blue Gene/P installation, "Shaheen", in 2009.
- In 2012, a 6-rack Blue Gene/P was installed at Rice University and will be jointly administered with the University of São Paulo.
- A 2.5 rack Blue Gene/P system is the central processor for the Low Frequency Array for Radio astronomy (LOFAR) project in the Netherlands and surrounding European countries. This application uses the streaming data capabilities of the machine.
- A 2-rack Blue Gene/P was installed in September 2008 in Sofia, Bulgaria, and is operated by the Bulgarian Academy of Sciences and Sofia University.
- In 2010, a 2-rack (8192-core) Blue Gene/P was installed at the University of Melbourne for the Victorian Life Sciences Computation Initiative.
- In 2011, a 2-rack Blue Gene/P was installed at University of Canterbury in Christchurch, New Zealand.
- In 2012, a 2-rack Blue Gene/P was installed at Rutgers University in Piscataway, New Jersey. It was dubbed "Excalibur" as an homage to the Rutgers mascot, the Scarlet Knight.
- In 2008, a 1-rack (1024 nodes) Blue Gene/P with 180 TB of storage was installed at the University of Rochester in Rochester, New York.
- The first Blue Gene/P in the ASEAN region was installed in 2010 at the Universiti of Brunei Darussalam's research centre, the UBD-IBM Centre. The installation has prompted research collaboration between the university and IBM research on climate modeling that will investigate the impact of climate change on flood forecasting, crop yields, renewable energy and the health of rainforests in the region among others.
- In 2013, a 1-rack Blue Gene/P was donated to the Department of Science and Technology of the Philippines for weather forecasts, disaster management, precision agriculture, and health. It is housed in the National Computer Center at the University of the Philippines Diliman, Quezon City, under the auspices of Philippine Genome Center Core Facility for Bioinformatics (CFB).

=== Applications ===
- Veselin Topalov, the challenger to the World Chess Champion title in 2010, confirmed in an interview that he had used a Blue Gene/P supercomputer during his preparation for the match.
- The Blue Gene/P computer has been used to simulate approximately one percent of a human cerebral cortex, containing 1.6 billion neurons with approximately 9 trillion connections.
- The IBM Kittyhawk project team has ported Linux to the compute nodes and demonstrated generic Web 2.0 workloads running at scale on a Blue Gene/P. Their paper, published in the ACM Operating Systems Review, describes a kernel driver that tunnels Ethernet over the tree network, which results in all-to-all TCP/IP connectivity. Running standard Linux software like MySQL, their performance results on SpecJBB rank among the highest on record.
- In 2011, a Rutgers University / IBM / University of Texas team linked the KAUST Shaheen installation together with a Blue Gene/P installation at the IBM Watson Research Center into a "federated high performance computing cloud", winning the IEEE SCALE 2011 challenge with an oil reservoir optimization application.

== Blue Gene/Q ==
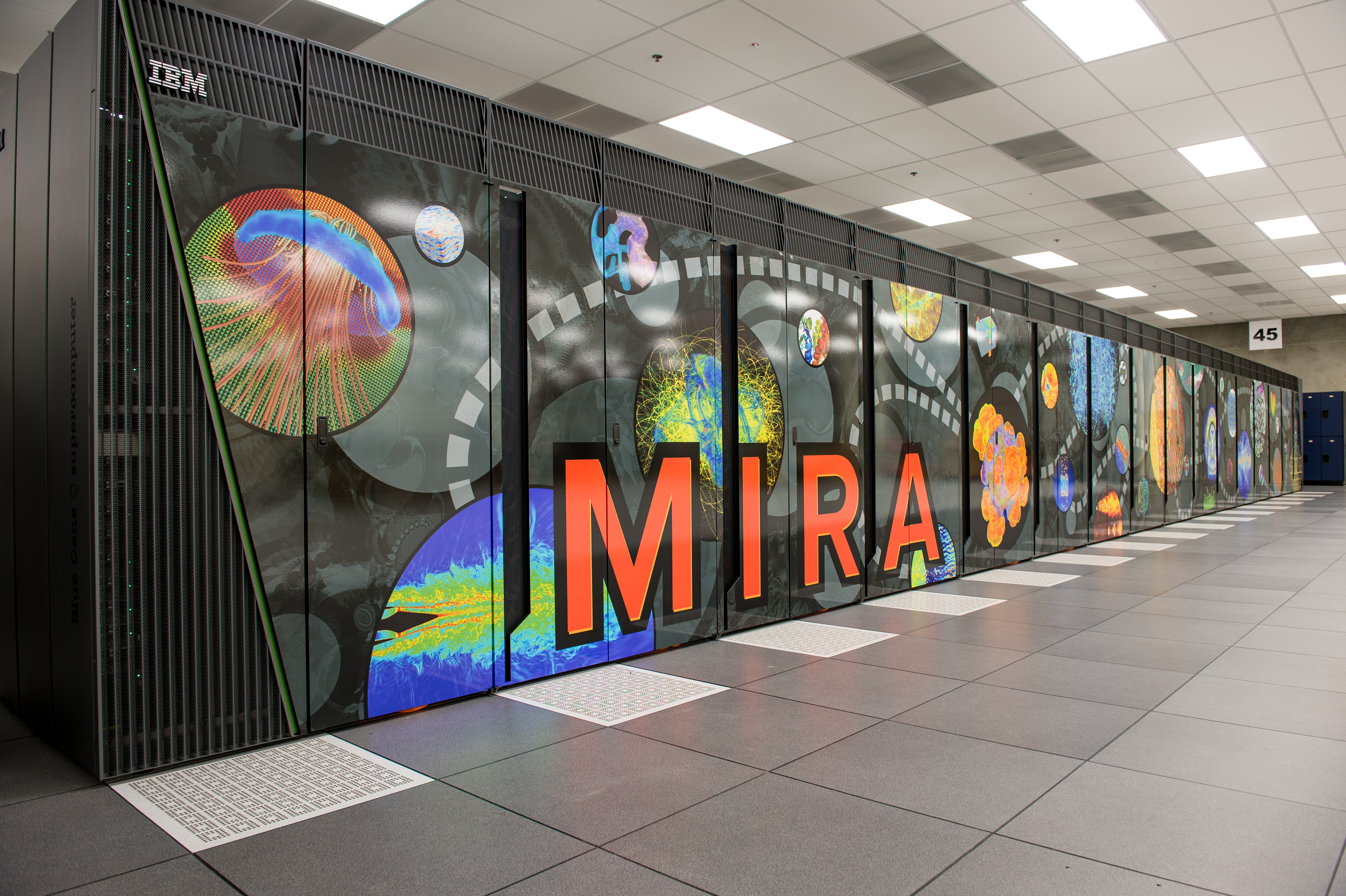
The IBM Blue Gene/Q installation Mira at the Argonne National Laboratory, near Chicago, Illinois

The third design in the Blue Gene series, Blue Gene/Q, significantly expanded and enhanced on the Blue Gene/L and /P architectures.

=== Design ===
The Blue Gene/Q "compute chip" is based on the 64-bit IBM A2 processor core. The A2 processor core is 4-way simultaneously multithreaded and was augmented with a SIMD quad-vector double-precision floating-point unit (IBM QPX). Each Blue Gene/Q compute chip contains 18 such A2 processor cores, running at 1.6 GHz. 16 Cores are used for application computing and a 17th core is used for handling operating system assist functions such as interrupts, asynchronous I/O, MPI pacing, and RAS. The 18th core is a redundant manufacturing spare, used to increase yield. The spared-out core is disabled prior to system operation. The chip's processor cores are linked by a crossbar switch to a 32 MB eDRAM L2 cache, operating at half core speed. The L2 cache is multi-versioned—supporting transactional memory and speculative execution—and has hardware support for atomic operations. L2 cache misses are handled by two built-in DDR3 memory controllers running at 1.33 GHz. The chip also integrates logic for chip-to-chip communications in a 5D torus configuration, with 2 GB/s chip-to-chip links. The Blue Gene/Q chip is manufactured on IBM's copper SOI process at 45 nm. It delivers a peak performance of 204.8 GFLOPS while drawing approximately 55 watts. The chip measures 19×19 mm (359.5 mm²) and comprises 1.47 billion transistors. Completing the compute node, the chip is mounted on a compute card along with 16 GB DDR3 DRAM (i.e., 1 GB for each user processor core).

A Q32 "compute drawer" contains 32 compute nodes, each water cooled. A "midplane" (crate) contains 16 Q32 compute drawers for a total of 512 compute nodes, electrically interconnected in a 5D torus configuration (4x4x4x4x2). Beyond the midplane level, all connections are optical. Racks have two midplanes, thus 32 compute drawers, for a total of 1024 compute nodes, 16,384 user cores, and 16 TB RAM.

Separate I/O drawers, placed at the top of a rack or in a separate rack, are air cooled and contain 8 compute cards and 8 PCIe expansion slots for InfiniBand or 10 Gigabit Ethernet networking.

=== Performance ===
At the time of the Blue Gene/Q system announcement in November 2011, an initial 4-rack Blue Gene/Q system (4096 nodes, 65536 user processor cores) achieved #17 in the TOP500 list with 677.1 TeraFLOPS Linpack, outperforming the original 2007 104-rack BlueGene/L installation described above. The same 4-rack system achieved the top position in the Graph500 list with over 250 GTEPS (giga traversed edges per second). Blue Gene/Q systems also topped the Green500 list of most energy efficient supercomputers with up to 2.1 GFLOPS/W.

In June 2012, Blue Gene/Q installations took the top positions in all three lists: TOP500, Graph500 and Green500.

=== Installations ===
The following is an incomplete list of Blue Gene/Q installations. Per June 2012, the TOP500 list contained 20 Blue Gene/Q installations of 1/2-rack (512 nodes, 8192 processor cores, 86.35 TFLOPS Linpack) and larger. At a (size-independent) power efficiency of about 2.1 GFLOPS/W, all these systems also populated the top of the June 2012 Green 500 list.

- A Blue Gene/Q system called Sequoia was delivered to the Lawrence Livermore National Laboratory (LLNL) beginning in 2011 and was fully deployed in June 2012. It is part of the Advanced Simulation and Computing Program running nuclear simulations and advanced scientific research. It consists of 96 racks (comprising 98,304 compute nodes with 1.6 million processor cores and 1.6 PB of memory) covering an area of about 3,000 square feet (280 m^{2}). In June 2012, the system was ranked as the world's fastest supercomputer. at 20.1 PFLOPS peak, 16.32 PFLOPS sustained (Linpack), drawing up to 7.9 megawatts of power. In June 2013, its performance is listed at 17.17 PFLOPS sustained (Linpack).
- A 10 PFLOPS (peak) Blue Gene/Q system called Mira was installed at Argonne National Laboratory in the Argonne Leadership Computing Facility in 2012. It consist of 48 racks (49,152 compute nodes), with 70 PB of disk storage (470 GB/s I/O bandwidth).
- JUQUEEN at the Forschungzentrum Jülich is a 28-rack Blue Gene/Q system, and was from June 2013 to November 2015 the highest ranked machine in Europe in the Top500.
- Vulcan at Lawrence Livermore National Laboratory (LLNL) is a 24-rack, 5 PFLOPS (peak), Blue Gene/Q system that was commissioned in 2012 and decommissioned in 2019. Vulcan served Lab-industry projects through Livermore's High Performance Computing (HPC) Innovation Center as well as academic collaborations in support of DOE/National Nuclear Security Administration (NNSA) missions.
- Fermi at the CINECA Supercomputing facility, Bologna, Italy, is a 10-rack, 2 PFLOPS (peak), Blue Gene/Q system.
- As part of DiRAC, the EPCC hosts a 6 rack (6144-node) Blue Gene/Q system at the University of Edinburgh
- A five rack Blue Gene/Q system with additional compute hardware called AMOS was installed at Rensselaer Polytechnic Institute in 2013. The system was rated at 1048.6 teraflops, the most powerful supercomputer at any private university, and third most powerful supercomputer among all universities in 2014.
- An 838 TFLOPS (peak) Blue Gene/Q system called Avoca was installed at the Victorian Life Sciences Computation Initiative in June, 2012. This system is part of a collaboration between IBM and VLSCI, with the aims of improving diagnostics, finding new drug targets, refining treatments and furthering our understanding of diseases. The system consists of 4 racks, with 350 TB of storage, 65,536 cores, 64 TB RAM.
- A 209 TFLOPS (peak) Blue Gene/Q system was installed at the University of Rochester in July, 2012. This system is part of the Health Sciences Center for Computational Innovation, which is dedicated to the application of high-performance computing to research programs in the health sciences. The system consists of a single rack (1,024 compute nodes) with 400 TB of high-performance storage.
- A 209 TFLOPS peak (172 TFLOPS LINPACK) Blue Gene/Q system called Lemanicus was installed at the EPFL in March 2013. This system belongs to the Center for Advanced Modeling Science CADMOS which is a collaboration between the three main research institutions on the shore of the Lake Geneva in the French speaking part of Switzerland : University of Lausanne, University of Geneva and EPFL. The system consists of a single rack (1,024 compute nodes) with 2.1 PB of IBM GPFS-GSS storage.
- A half-rack Blue Gene/Q system, with about 100 TFLOPS (peak), called Cumulus was installed at A*STAR Computational Resource Centre, Singapore, at early 2011.

=== Applications ===
Record-breaking science applications have been run on the BG/Q, the first to cross 10 petaflops of sustained performance. The cosmology simulation framework HACC achieved almost 14 petaflops with a 3.6 trillion particle benchmark run, while the Cardioid code, which models the electrophysiology of the human heart, achieved nearly 12 petaflops with a near real-time simulation, both on Sequoia. A fully compressible flow solver has also achieved 14.4 PFLOP/s (originally 11 PFLOP/s) on Sequoia, 72% of the machine's nominal peak performance.

== See also ==
- CNK operating system
- INK operating system
- Deep Blue (chess computer)

Records
Preceded by NEC Earth Simulator; 35.86 teraflops	World's most powerful supercomputer Blue Gene/L; 70.72 - 478.20 teraflops November 2004 – November 2007	Succeeded by IBM Roadrunner; 1.026 petaflops
Preceded by Fujitsu K computer 10.51 petaflops	Blue Gene/Q; 16.32 petaflops June 2012 – November 2012	Succeeded by Cray Titan; 17.59 petaflops
