= King Abdullah University of Science and Technology =

University in Thuwal, Saudi Arabia

Coordinates: 22.312602°N 39.11047°E

- Motto: "Through Inspiration, Discovery"
- Type: Public university
- Established: September 23, 2009; 16 years ago
- Endowment: $20 billion
- Chairman: Abdulaziz bin Salman
- President: Sir Edward Byrne
- Location: 4700 King Abdullah University of Science and Technology, Thuwal, Mecca Province, 23955-6900, Saudi Arabia
- Campus: 3,600 hectares (8,900 acres)
- Website: www.kaust.edu.sa

The King Abdullah University of Science and Technology (KAUST; Arabic: جامعة الملك عبد الله للعلوم و التقنية jāmiʿat al-malik ʿabd al-Lāh li-l-ʿulūm wa-t-teqniyya) is a public research university located in Thuwal, Saudi Arabia. Founded in 2009, the university provides research and graduate training programs in English as the official language of instruction. It is named after King Abdullah bin Abdulaziz, the ruler of Saudi Arabia from 2005 until 2015.

KAUST is the first mixed-gender university campus in Saudi Arabia. In 2013, the university was among the 500 fastest growing research and citation records in the world. In the 2016 Nature Index Rising Stars, the university ranked 19th in the world of the fastest rising universities for high-quality research output.

In 2019, KAUST was ranked the 8th fastest rising young university (aged 50 and under) for research output since 2015, as measured by fractional count (FC). In 2025, KAUST was ranked #1 among Arab Universities for the third consecutive year by Times Higher Education.

The university's fourth president, neuroscientist Sir Edward Byrne, took office in September of 2024.

== History ==
In 2006, Ali Al-Naimi chaired a Saudi Aramco team to undertake the building and planning of the academics. Nadhmi Al-Nasr was chosen to lead the project. They employed the Washington Advisory Group's Frank H. T. Rhodes and Frank Press to design the academic structure, SRI International to develop the four research institutes, and the architectural firm of HOK for the campus master plan, which included wind towers and solar panels. The location of the campus at Thuwal included 16.4 sq km on land and 19.6 sq km of marine sanctuary offshore. Ground breaking took place in October 2007, and 178 scholarships were awarded in January 2008.

The inauguration ceremony of KAUST was held on September 23, 2009, during which King Abdullah Bin Abdulaziz Al Saud stated that places like the university that "embrace all people are the first line of defence against extremists." The university initially received a $10 billion endowment. Upon opening, the university admitted 400 students from over 60 countries and 70 faculty. The campus is home to Shaheen, the fastest supercomputer in the Middle East at the time of its commissioning.

At its opening, KAUST became the first mixed-gender university campus in Saudi Arabia. The religious police did not operate on campus, and women were permitted to mix freely with men and were not required to wear veils in coeducational classes, practices that were unusual in the Kingdom at the time. The mixed-gender campus was seen by Saudi authorities as a potential catalyst for broader social change in the Kingdom.

In September 2018, KAUST signed a five-year R&D partnership agreement with McLaren.

== Campus ==
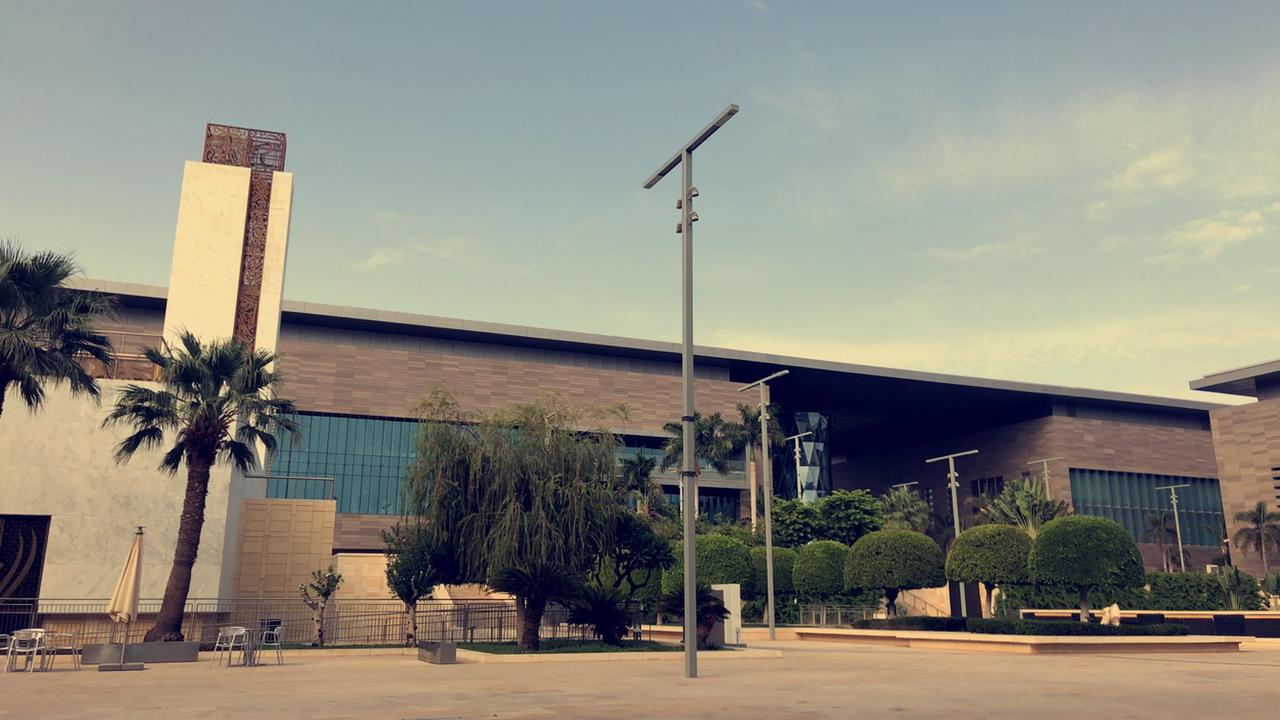
KAUST's campus with the campus mosque appearing on the left

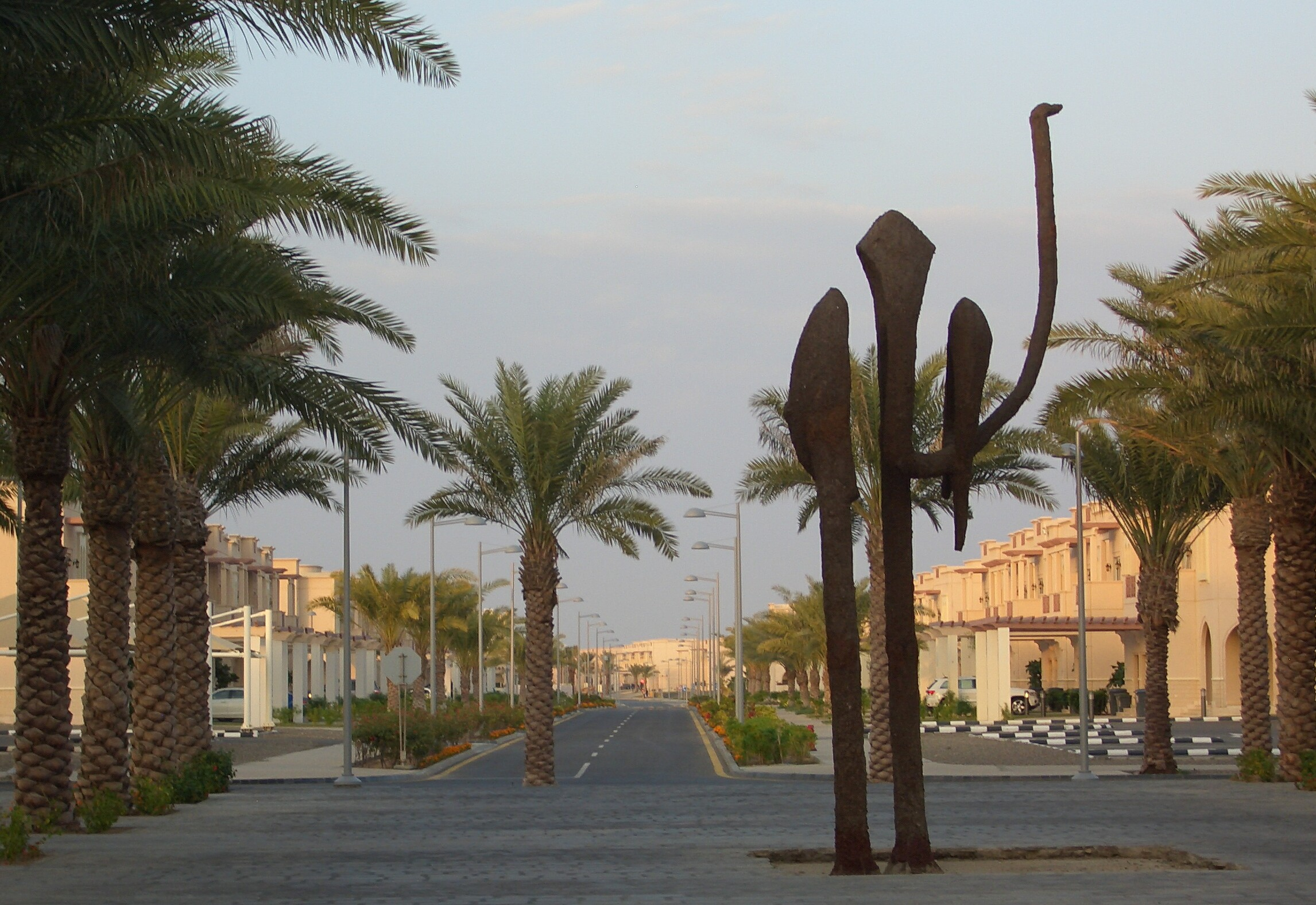
Residential street with outdoor sculpture

The university's core campus, located on the Red Sea at Thuwal, is sited on more than 36 square kilometres (14 mi^{2}), encompassing a marine sanctuary and research facilities.

KAUST was Saudi Arabia's first LEED certified project and is the world's largest LEED Platinum campus. Designed by international architecture firm Hellmuth, Obata and Kassabaum, it was also chosen by the American Institute of Architects (AIA) Committee on the Environment (COTE) as one of the 2010 Top Ten Green Projects. The university library received the 2011 AIA/ALA Library Building Award for accomplishments in library architecture.

== Research ==
KAUST organizes its research teams across three academic disciplines, 12 research centers and individual faculty labs. KAUST focuses its research around the areas of food and health, water, energy, environment and the digital domain.

KAUST is the highest-ranked university in the Arab world in the Times Higher Education Arab University Rankings, placing first for the third consecutive year in 2025. In the 2025 Nature Index of Research Leaders, KAUST ranked second among academic institutions in Western Asia by share of high-quality natural- and health-science research output, behind only the Weizmann Institute of Science.

=== Academic divisions ===
Research in the Biological and Environmental Science and Engineering Division (BESE) is organized around six focal areas: environmental systems; epigenetics; functional biology; genomics; imaging/structural biology; and marine science.

Research in the Computer, Electrical and Mathematical Sciences and Engineering Division (CEMSE) is clustered into four main areas:

- Electrical engineering, including the development of communication networks; CMOS integrated circuits; electronic and optics/photonics devices; micro-electro-mechanical systems; various types of sensors, measurement and detection devices; as well as functional- and nano-materials.
- Mathematical analysis, including modeling and simulations with applications to physical, chemical, biological and environmental processes; materials science; oil exploration and reservoir management.
- Computer science and big data, including bioinformatics; and visual and extreme computing.
- Statistics and data science, including climate science, environmental statistics, and biostatistics.

Research in the Physical Sciences and Engineering Division (PSE) includes areas such as theoretical physics and physical chemistry; catalysis and bioengineering; polymers and composites; energy production, storage and conversion; water purification and environmental protection; novel materials, nanodevices and systems; sensors and smart devices for the detection of pollutants and the purification of air, water, and food; earth sciences, mechanics and geomechanics; oil exploration and recovery; and CO_{2} sequestration.

=== Centers of Excellence ===
In September 2024, KAUST launched four new Centers of Excellence (CoEs) aimed at driving research, development and innovation (RDI) to address Saudi Arabia's four RDI priorities: Health and Wellness, Sustainable Environment, Energy and Industrial Leadership, and Economies of the Future.

The CoE for Renewable Energy and Storage Technologies develops and deploys renewable energy and storage technologies, supporting Saudi Arabia's sustainable energy transition by prototyping and commercializing innovations. KAUST Professor Husam Alshareef, Materials Science and Engineering, is CoE chair, and Professor Zhiping Lai, Chemistry, is co-chair.

The CoE for Smart Health develops and deploys digital and AI-driven technologies aimed at transforming healthcare delivery in Saudi Arabia through precision medicine. KAUST Professor Imed Gallouzi, Bioscience, is CoE chair, and Professor Xin Gao, Computer Science, is co-chair.

The CoE for Generative AI pursues Generative AI research and develops general-purpose AI models to meet Saudi Arabia's RDI priorities. KAUST Professor Bernard Ghanem, Electrical and Computer Engineering, is CoE chair, and Professor Jürgen Schmidhuber, Computer Science, is co-chair.

The CoE for Sustainable Food Security develops agricultural technologies to enhance resource efficiency, crop improvement and sustainable biosystems, aimed at strengthening Saudi and global food security. KAUST Professor Mark Tester, Plant Science, is CoE chair; Professor Peiying Hong, Environmental Science and Engineering, and Associate Professor Brande Wulff, Plant Science, are co-chairs.

=== Clarivate Highly Cited Researchers ===
The following are the KAUST professors on Clarivate's 2025 list of Highly Cited Researchers:

- Thomas G. Allen – Cross-field citations
- Osman Bakr – Materials Science
- Derya Baran – Cross-field citations
- Hylke Beck – Geosciences
- Luigi Cavallo – Cross-field citations
- Thomas Crowther – Environment and Ecology
- Stefaan De Wolf – Listed twice for Engineering and Materials Science
- Carlos M. Duarte – Listed twice for Environment and Ecology, and Plant and Animal Science
- Mohamed Eddaoudi – Chemistry
- Frédéric Laquai – Cross-field citations
- Fernando Maestre – Environment and Ecology
- Matthew McCabe – Cross-field citations
- Omar Mohammed – Cross-field citations
- Yoshihide Wada – Listed twice for Environment and Ecology, and Geosciences
- Huabin Zhang – Cross-field citations

University rankings

Global – Overall
- ARWU World: 201-300 (2025)
- USNWR Global: 103 (2026-2027)

== Postgraduate programs ==
The Master of Science (M.S.) program at KAUST can be taken in one of the available disciplines. It is expected that students complete the degree in 18 months and may be completed with or without a thesis component. Admission to the M.S. program requires the satisfactory completion of an undergraduate science degree in a relevant or related area, such as engineering, mathematics or the physical, chemical and biological sciences.

The Doctor of Philosophy (Ph.D.) program at KAUST can be taken in one of the available disciplines. It typically takes three to four years to complete. Admission to the Ph.D. program requires the satisfactory completion of a master's degree in science in a relevant or related area, such as engineering, mathematics or the physical, chemical and biological sciences.

The M.S./Ph.D. program allows students to apply for the Ph.D. program after completing a bachelor's degree. The program typically takes four to five years to complete.

KAUST offers a one-year postgraduate diploma in Digital Industrial Design, Physical Science and Engineering, and Bioscience. Each program is made up of soft skill, experimental, theoretical and entrepreneurship courses as well as a capstone experience.

=== Academic programs ===
- Applied Mathematics and Computational Science (AMCS)
- Bioengineering (BIOE)
- Bioscience
- Chemical Engineering (CE)
- Chemistry (CHEM)
- Computer Science (CS)
- Earth Systems Science and Engineering (ESSE)
- Electrical and Computer Engineering (ECE)
- Environmental Science and Engineering (ENSE)
- Marine Science (MARS)
- Material Science and Engineering and Applied Physics (MSEAP)
- Mechanical Engineering (ME)
- Plant Science (PS)
- Statistics (STAT)

== Admissions ==
KAUST does not set a minimum grade threshold for admission; applicants are assessed on their academic record and research interests, and must meet English language requirements unless exempt.

=== Fellowship ===
Every student who is admitted receives the KAUST Fellowship. This fellowship covers the cost of a student's tuition fees, accommodation, health insurance, and relocation costs as well as providing a monthly stipend.

=== Internship programs ===
The Visiting Student Research Program (VSRP) is a three to six-month internship program available for third- and fourth-year undergraduate or master's students, who work under the guidance of KAUST faculty mentors on a current research project. Students accepted into the program receive a monthly stipend, accommodation, health insurance, and travel costs. The Visiting Student Program (VS) is a more flexible arrangement allowing similar students to work directly with KAUST faculty for periods ranging from a few days to several months, on comparable terms.

== See also ==
- Education in Saudi Arabia
- Shaheen (supercomputer)
- List of things named after Saudi kings
- List of universities and colleges in Saudi Arabia
