= List of modern great powers =

List of great powers from the early modern period to the post-Cold War era

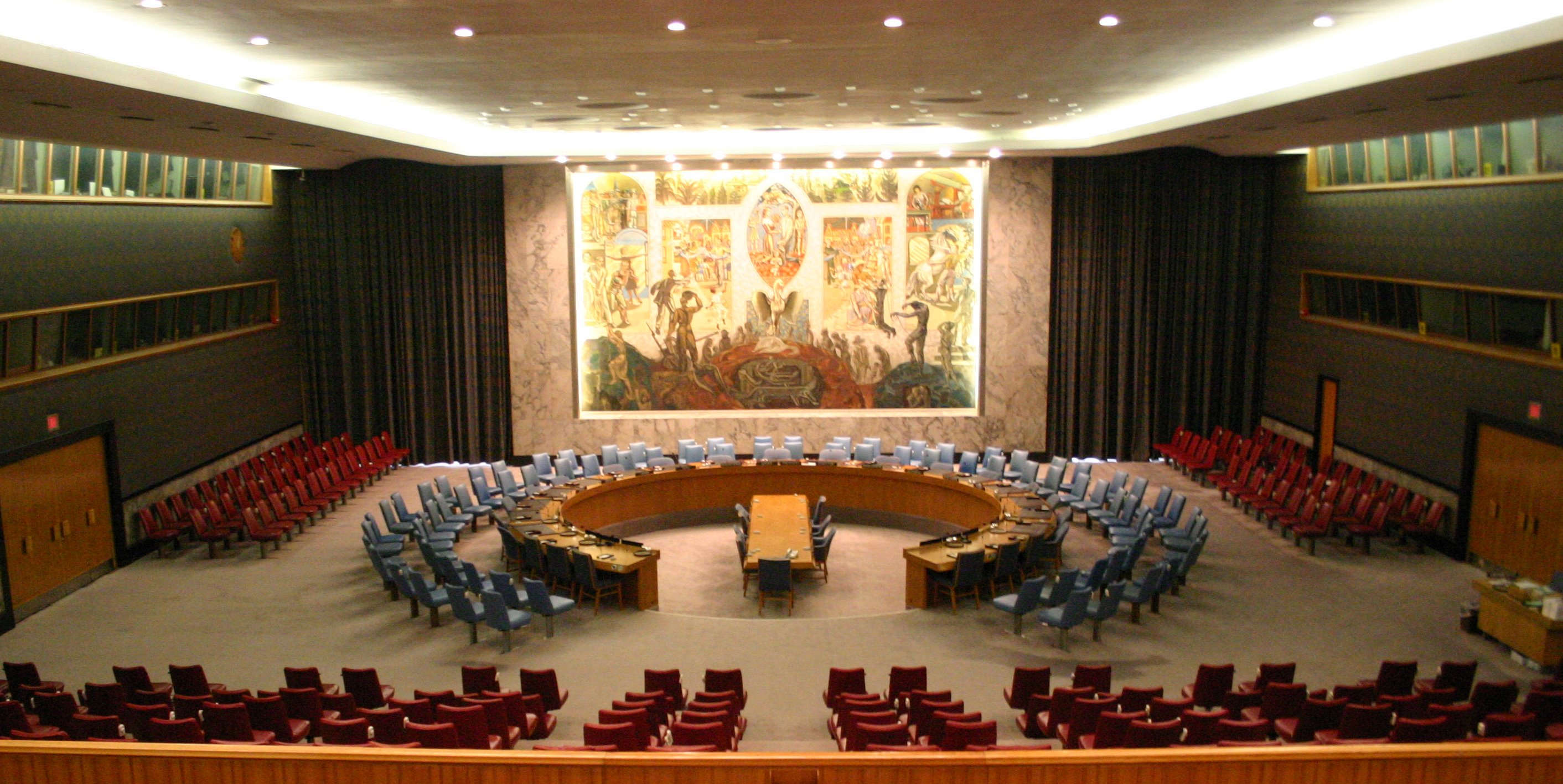
Great powers are often recognized in an international structure such as the United Nations Security Council.

A great power is a nation, state or empire that, through its economic, political and military strength, is able to exert power and influence not only over its own region of the world, but beyond to others. A great power typically possesses military, economic, and diplomatic strength that it can wield to influence the actions of middle or small powers.

In a modern context, recognized great powers first arose in Europe during the post-Napoleonic era. The formalization of the division between small powers and great powers came about with the signing of the Treaty of Chaumont in 1814.

The historical terms "Great Nation", a distinguished aggregate of people inhabiting a particular country or territory, and "Great Empire", a considerable group of states or countries under a single supreme authority, are colloquial; their use is seen in ordinary historical conversations.

The internationally recognized great powers today are China, France, Germany, Italy, Japan, Russia, the United Kingdom, and the United States, with India being the most likely country to become a great power in the near future.

== Early modern great powers ==
=== France (1214–) ===
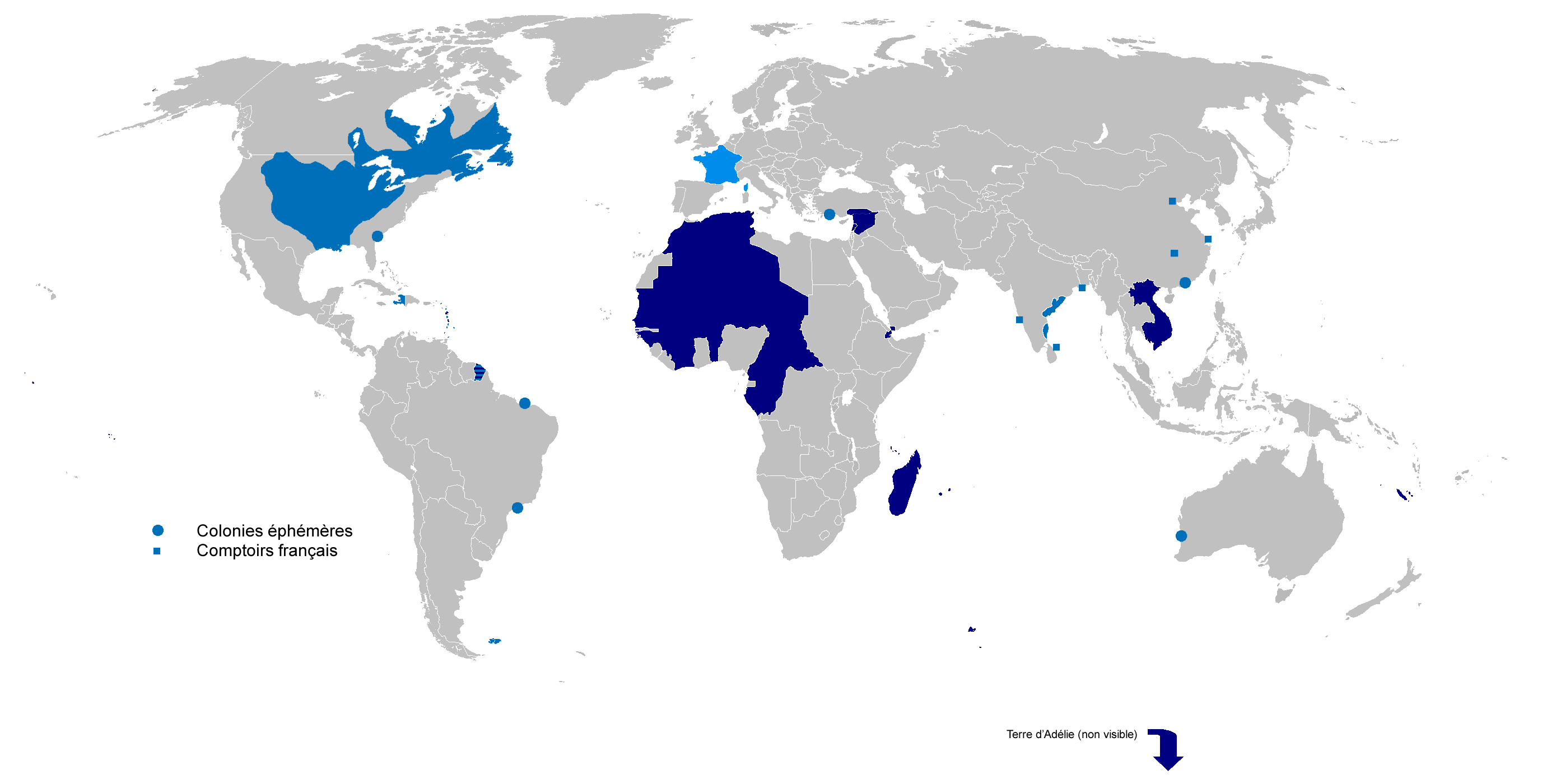
The first (light blue) and second (dark blue) French colonial empires

France has been one of the leading powers in Europe and the world, since the breakup of the Carolingian Empire and the emergence of West Francia, its predecessor state, although its power was only truly consolidated from 1214 onwards with its victory in the Anglo-French War. Over the 14th century, French kings would focus on bringing more of the kingdom's lands under their direct control, as France emerged as the most populous region in Europe by 1340. After the discovery of the New World, France became a dominant empire possessing many colonies in various locations around the world. Still participating in his deadly Italian conflicts, Francis I of France managed to finance expeditions to find trade routes to China or Cathay through landmass already discovered by the Spanish under Giovanni da Verrazzano. Giovanni would lead the first French discovery of the "New World" just north of the Spanish invasions of Mesoamerica, later as New Spain, and a decade later, Jacques Cartier would firmly colonize the landmass in the name of Francis I. This New World colony would become New France, the first colony of the Kingdom of France. In the 1500s, France was still the most populous country in Europe, and would remain so until the mid-19th to late 19th century. During the reign of Louis XIV, the Sun King, from 1643 to 1715, France was the leading European power as Europe's richest and most powerful country. The dominance of France over world affairs extended to most foreign European courts speaking French, including other great powers of the time such as England, Sweden, and Russia.

From the 16th to the 17th centuries, the first French colonial empire stretched over a total area, at its peak in 1680, of up to 10 million km^{2} (3.9 million sq mi), the second-largest empire in the world at the time behind only the Spanish Empire (which France would also take control of, briefly, under Napoleon). It had many possessions around the world, mainly in the Americas, Asia, and Africa. France has kept some of these possessions to this day, integrating them into its territory, such as La Réunion. At its peak in 1750, French India had an area of 1.5 million km^{2} (0.58 million sq mi) and a totaled population of 30 million people, making it the most populous colony under French rule.

At the onset of the French Revolutionary Wars, early French victories exported many ideological features of the French Revolution throughout Europe. Napoleon gained support by appealing to people's common concerns. In France, these included fear by some of a restoration of the ancien régime, a dislike of the Bourbons and the emigrant nobility who had escaped the country, a suspicion of foreign kings who had tried to reverse the Revolution, and a wish by Jacobins to extend France's revolutionary ideals.

Napoleon became Emperor of the French (French: L'Empereur des Français) on 18 May 1804 and crowned Emperor on 2 December 1804, ending the period of the French Consulate, and won early military victories in the Napoleonic Wars against most European allied nations, notably at the Battle of Austerlitz (1805) and the Battle of Friedland (1807). Subsequent years of military victories extended French influence over much of Western Europe and into Poland. At its height in 1812, the French Empire had 134 départements, ruled over 90 million subjects, maintained an extensive military presence in Germany, Italy, Spain, and the Duchy of Warsaw, and could count Prussia, Russia, and Austria as nominal allies. The First French Empire (1804–1814, 1815), otherwise known as the Napoleonic Empire, was also the dominant power of much of continental Europe, and ruled over 90 million people at its height. It was the preeminent power in Europe, if not the world, as Britain was its only rival during the early 19th century, the two countries battling for supremacy over the world, with France dominating on land and Britain on the sea.

The feudal system was abolished, aristocratic privileges were eliminated in all places except Poland, and the introduction of the Napoleonic Code throughout the continent increased legal equality, established jury systems, and legalized divorce. Napoleon placed his relatives on European thrones and granted many titles, most of which expired with the fall of the Empire. Napoleon and South India Mysore ruler Tipu Sultan wished to ally, having provided Mysore with French volunteers during the Anglo-Mysore Wars, with the continuous aim of having an eventual open way to attack the British in India.

Historians have estimated the death toll from the Napoleonic Wars to be around 5 million people, or 15% of the French Empire's subjects. After Napoleon's disastrous invasion of Russia, the continental powers joined Russia, Britain, Portugal, and the rebels in Spain. The War of the Sixth Coalition, a coalition of Austria, Prussia, Russia, the United Kingdom, Sweden, Spain, and several German states, finally defeated France and drove Napoleon into exile on Elba. When he returned, the coalition invaded France again, forcing Napoleon to abdicate and thus leading to the restoration of Bourbon rule.

=== England and United Kingdom (1588–) ===
At the end of the 16th century, having secured its position as a strong naval power, England began to challenge the Portuguese Empire's monopoly of trade with Asia, forming private joint-stock companies to finance the voyages: most notably the English, later British, East India Company, chartered in 1600. The primary aim of these companies was to tap into the lucrative spice trade, focusing mainly on two regions: the East Indies archipelago and India. There, England competed for trade supremacy with Portugal and the Netherlands. Although England eventually eclipsed both countries as a colonial power, in the short term, the three Anglo-Dutch Wars of the 17th century left the Netherlands with a stronger position in Asia. Hostilities ceased when, in 1688, the Dutch William of Orange invaded and ascended to the English throne in what is known as the Glorious Revolution – bringing peace between the Dutch Republic and England. A deal between the two nations left the spice trade of the East Indies archipelago to the Netherlands and trade in the textiles industry of India to England, but textiles soon overtook spices in profitability.

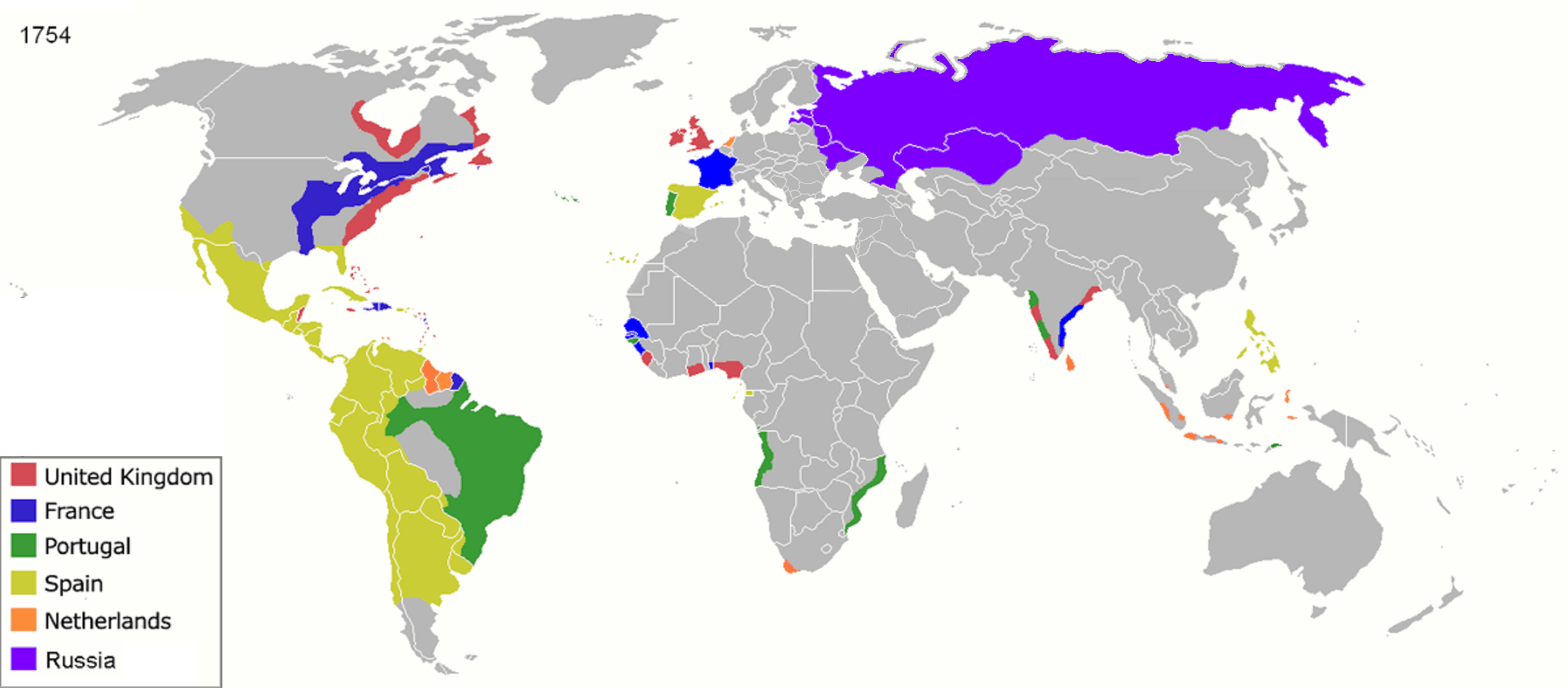
1754 map, British Empire in red

During the 16th to 18th centuries, British colonies were created along the east coast of North America. The southern colonies had a plantation economy, made possible by slavery, which produced tobacco and cotton. This cotton was especially important in the development of British textile towns and the rise of the world's first Industrial Revolution in Britain by the end of the 18th century. The northern colonies provided timber, ships, furs, and whale oil for lamps, allowing work to be done at times of the day without natural light. All of these colonies served as important captive markets for British finished goods and trade goods, including British textiles, Indian tea, West Indian coffee, and other items.

The British Empire participated officially in the Seven Years' War from 1756, a war described by some historians as the world's first World War. The British had hoped winning the war against its colonial rival France would improve the defensibility of its important American colonies, where tensions from settlers eager to move west of the Appalachian Mountains had been a substantive issue. The new British-Prussian alliance was successful in forcing France to cede Canada to Britain, and Louisiana to Spain, thus ostensibly securing British North America from external threats as intended. The war also allowed Britain to capture the proto-industrialised Bengal from the French-allied Mughal Empire, then Britain's largest competitor (and by far the world's single largest producer) in the textile trade, it was also able to flip Hyderabad from the Mughals to its cause, and capture the bulk of French territorial possessions in India, effectively shutting them out of the sub-continent. Importantly, the war also saw Britain becoming the dominant global naval power.

Despite its successes in the Seven Years' War, the British government was left close to bankruptcy, and in response, it raised taxes considerably to pay its debts. Britain was also faced with the delicate task of pacifying its new French-Canadian subjects, as well as the many American Indian tribes who had supported France, without provoking a new war with France. In 1763, Pontiac's War broke out as a group of Indian tribes in the Great Lakes region and the Northwest (the modern American Midwest) were unhappy with the loss of congenial and friendly relations with the French and complained about being cheated by the new British monopoly on trade. Moreover, the Native Americans feared that British rule would lead to white settlers displacing them from their land, whereas it was known that the French had only come as fur traders, and indeed this had been the source of animosity on the part of British settlers with France and part of the reason the war had started in the first place. Pontiac's War was going very badly for the British, and it was only with their victory at the Battle of Bushy Run that a complete collapse of British power in the Great Lakes region was avoided.

A portion of eastern North America; the 1763 "proclamation line" is the border between the red and the pink areas.

In response, King George III issued the Royal Proclamation of 1763, which forbade white settlement beyond the crest of the Appalachians, with the hope of appeasing the Indians and preventing further insurrection, but this led to considerable outrage in the Thirteen Colonies, whose inhabitants were eager to acquire native lands. The Quebec Act of 1774, similarly intended to win over the loyalty of French Canadians, also spurred resentment among American colonists. As such, dissatisfaction with the Royal Proclamation and "Taxation Without Representation" are said to have led to the Thirteen Colonies declaring their independence and starting the American War of Independence (1775–1783).

This war was comprehensively supported by Britain's competitors, France and Spain, and Britain lost. Britain and the new United States of America were able to retain the pre-existing trade arrangements, minimizing long-term harm to British trading interests. After the war, the American trade deficit with Britain was approximately 5:1, leading to a shortage of gold for several years. However, the British Empire would shift its focus from North America to India, expanding from its new base in Bengal and signaling the beginning of the second phase of the British Empire.

=== Russia (1703–) ===
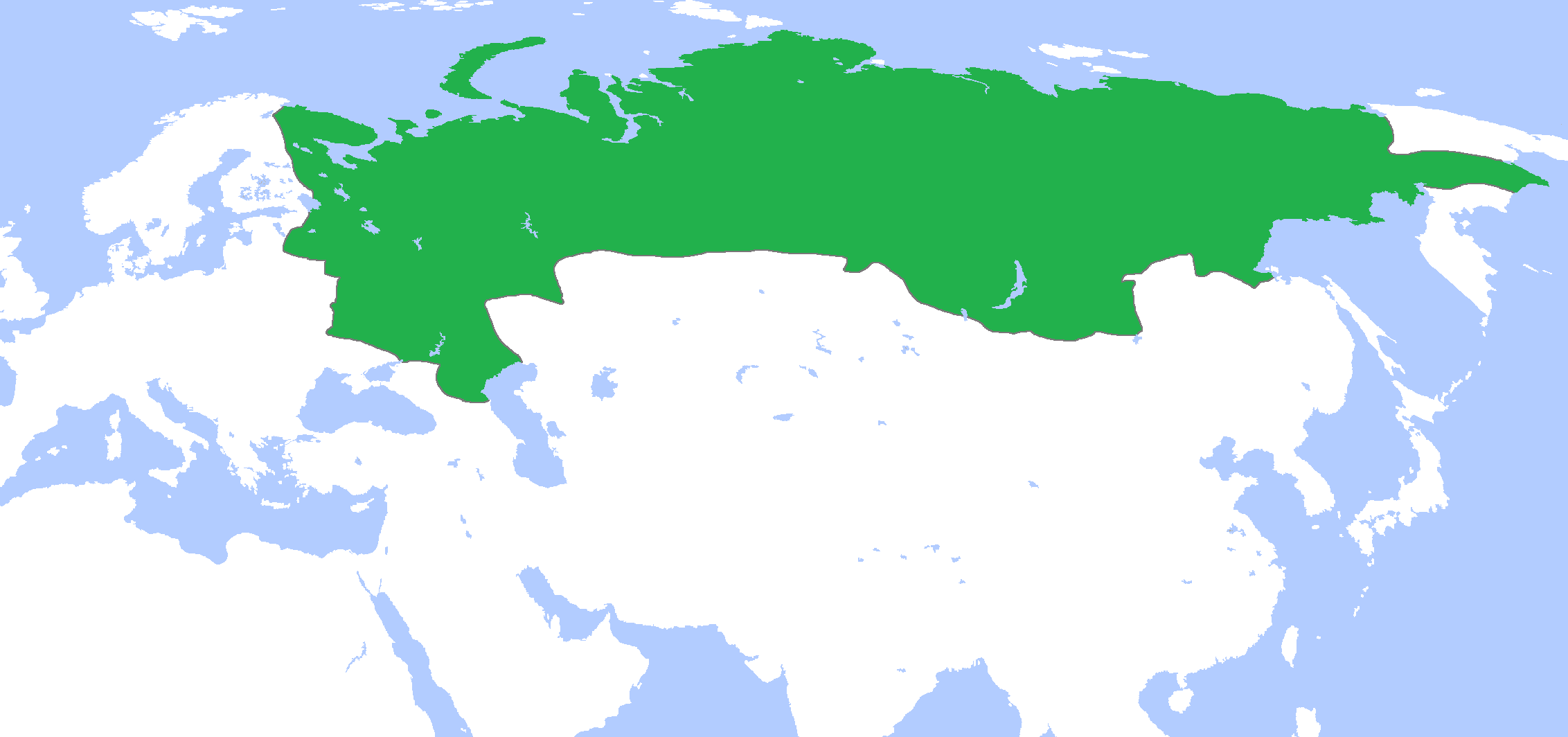
The Tsardom of Russia, c. 1700, during the reign of Peter the Great

The Russian Empire formed from what was the Tsardom of Russia under Peter the Great. Peter fought numerous wars and expanded an already vast empire, making it a major European power. In 1703, he moved the capital from Moscow to the new model city of Saint Petersburg, which was largely built in the Western style. This would be the turning point of a series of major reforms he would gradually enact in Russia, aiming to transform the country into a westernized, major player on the world stage. He led a cultural revolution that replaced some of the traditionalist and medieval social and political mores with a modern, scientific, Western-oriented, and rationalist system. His victory over Sweden in the Great Northern War in 1721 saw Russia being recognized as a great power, dominating the Baltic region. The Empire was officially proclaimed after the war, with Peter becoming the first Emperor of Russia.

Empresses Elizabeth and Catherine the Great presided over a golden age; in the late 17th century, they expanded the state by conquest, colonization, and diplomacy, while continuing Peter I's policy of modernization along Western European lines. Emperor Alexander I played a major role in defeating Napoleon's ambitions to control Europe, as well as constituting the short-lived Holy Alliance of conservative eastern European monarchies. Russia further expanded to the west, south, and east, becoming one of the most powerful European empires of the time. Its victories in the Russo-Turkish Wars were checked by defeat in the Crimean War (1853–1856), which led to a period of reform and intensified expansion in Central Asia. Following these conquests, Russia's territories spanned across Eurasia, with its western borders ending in eastern Poland, and its eastern borders ending in Alaska. By the end of the 19th century, the area of the empire was about 22,800,000 square kilometers (8,800,000 sq mi), or almost 1/6 of the Earth's landmass; its only rival in size at the time was the British Empire. The majority of the population lived in European Russia. More than 100 ethnic groups lived in the Russian Empire, with Russians comprising about 45% of the population. Emperor Alexander II initiated numerous reforms, most dramatically the emancipation of all 23 million serfs in 1861.

=== Ottoman Empire (1453–1875) ===
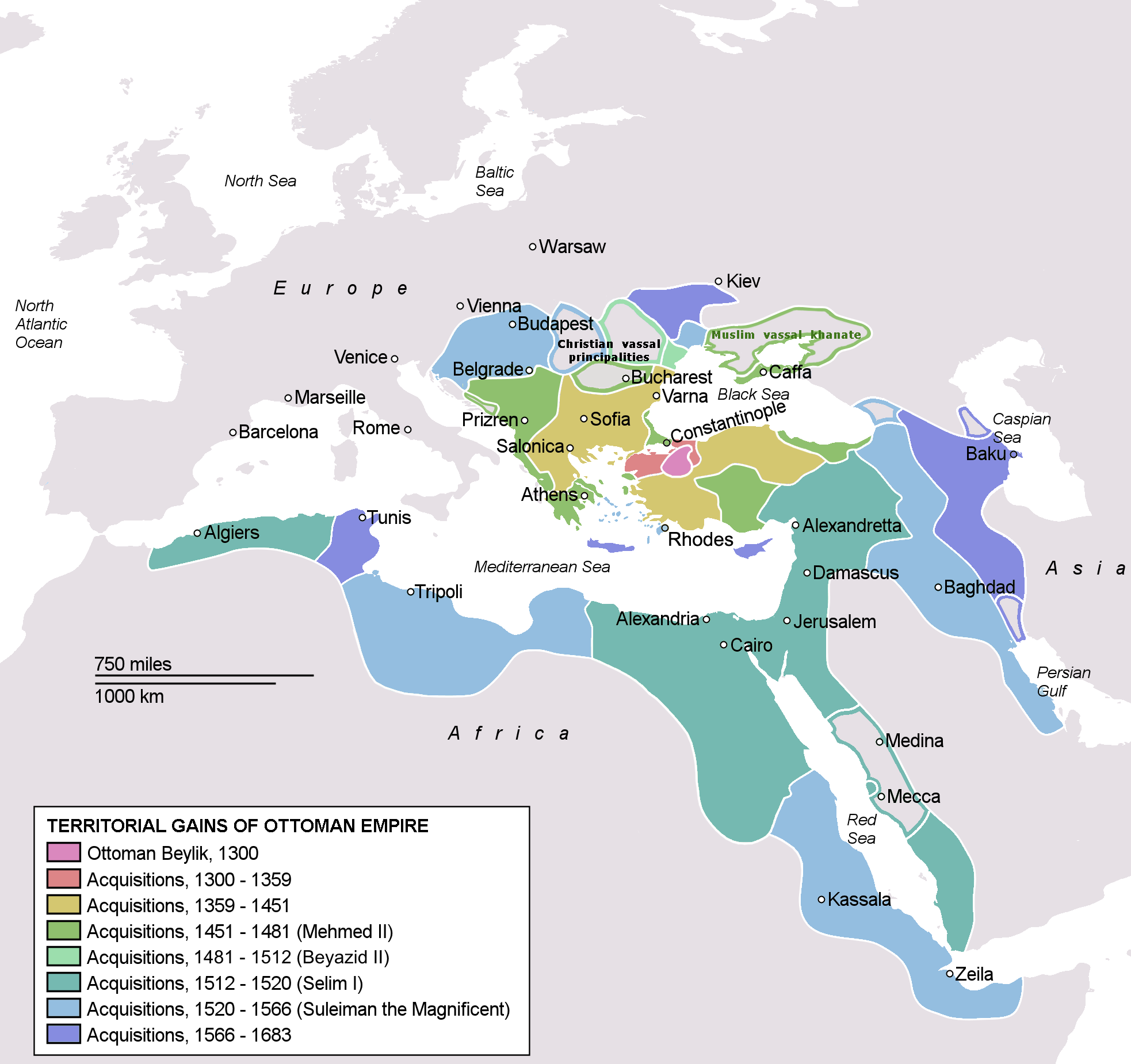
Ottoman territories at its greatest extent

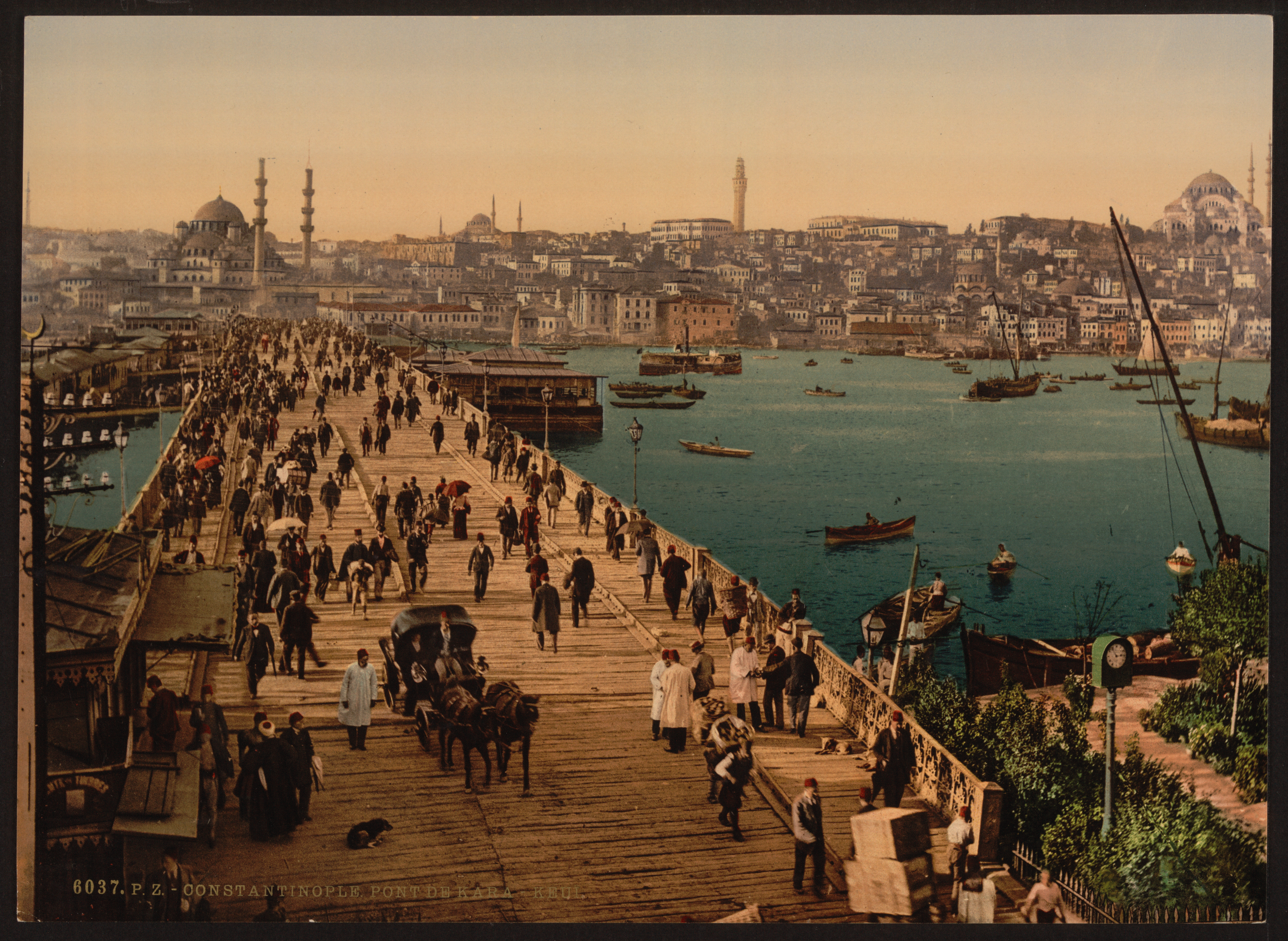
Galata Bridge in Constantinople, between the 19th and 20th century

The Ottoman Empire was a Turkic state, which at the height of its power in the 16th–17th centuries spanned three continents, controlling parts of Southeastern Europe, the Middle East, and most of North Africa. The empire has been called by historians a "Universal Empire" due to having both Roman and Islamic traditions. It was one of the powerful gunpowder empires.

The empire was at the center of interactions between the Eastern and Western worlds for several centuries. The Ottoman Empire was the only power in the world to seriously challenge the rising power of Western Europe between the 15th and 19th centuries. With Constantinople (today Istanbul) as its capital, the Empire was, in some respects, an Islamic successor to an earlier Mediterranean empire—the Eastern Roman Empire.

The effective military and bureaucratic structures of the early Empire also came under strain, while the Ottomans gradually fell behind European powers in military technology. Causes of this long decline are still debated today: the Ottoman decline thesis was the predominant view for most of history, but recent discoveries tend to contradict it. Potential factors contributing to this decline include a protracted period of misrule by weak Sultans; stifled innovation and research due to growing religious and intellectual conservatism; public or military opposition to reform; or simply a need to transform the country for it to survive, which could have hampered all efforts to strengthen the state itself.

Despite these difficulties, the Empire remained a major expansionist power until the Battle of Vienna in 1683, which marked the end of Ottoman expansion into Europe and its maximum territorial extent on the continent.

Ottoman military reform efforts began with Selim III (1789–1807), who made the first major attempts to modernize the army along European lines. These efforts, however, were hampered by reactionary movements, partly from the religious leadership, but primarily from the Janissary corps, who had become anarchic and ineffectual. Jealous of their privileges and firmly opposed to change, they revolted and deposed him. Selim's efforts cost him his throne and his life. Still, they were resolved in spectacular and bloody fashion by his successor, the dynamic Mahmud II, who massacred the Janissary corps in 1826. Even then, it was too late: much of the decline took place in the 19th century under pressure from Russia and various other powers, beginning with the Greek War of Independence, and culminating in 1875 in the Great Eastern Crisis: by 1882, the Empire had lost effective control of Egypt, Tunisia, and more. The Balkans were lost by 1913, leading to a coup d'état, and the Empire disintegrated after the First World War, leaving Turkey as its successor state.

=== Portugal (1415–1822) ===
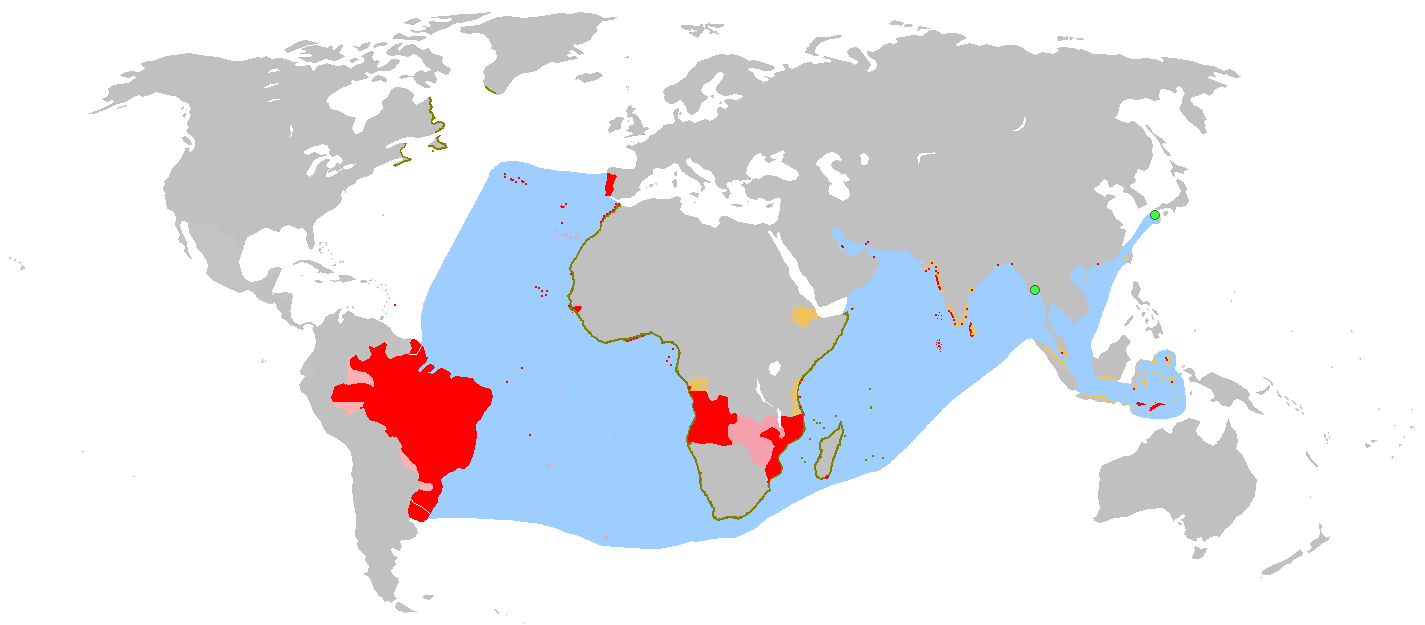
Portuguese Empire (1415–1999)

The Portuguese Empire was the first empire to have territory on all continents, as well as the earliest and longest-lived of the Western European colonial empires, lasting from 1415 to 1999. Portugal's small size and population restricted the empire, in the 16th century and beyond, to a collection of small but well-defended outposts along the African coasts, alongside three vast colonies, Angola, Mozambique and Brazil. For most of the 16th century, the Portuguese Indian Armadas, then one of the strongest navies in shipbuilding and naval artillery, dominated most of the Atlantic Ocean south of the Canary Islands, the Indian Ocean, and the western Pacific Ocean. The height of the empire was reached in the 16th century, but isolation and competition with new colonial empires like the British, French, and Dutch began its long, gradual decline. After the 18th century, Portugal focused on the colonization of Brazil and its African possessions. However, following the Liberal Revolution of 1820, Brazil soon declared independence and the Portuguese Empire lost its most prized possession.

=== Spain (1469–1819) ===
The areas of the Spanish Empire at various times over a period exceeding 400 years

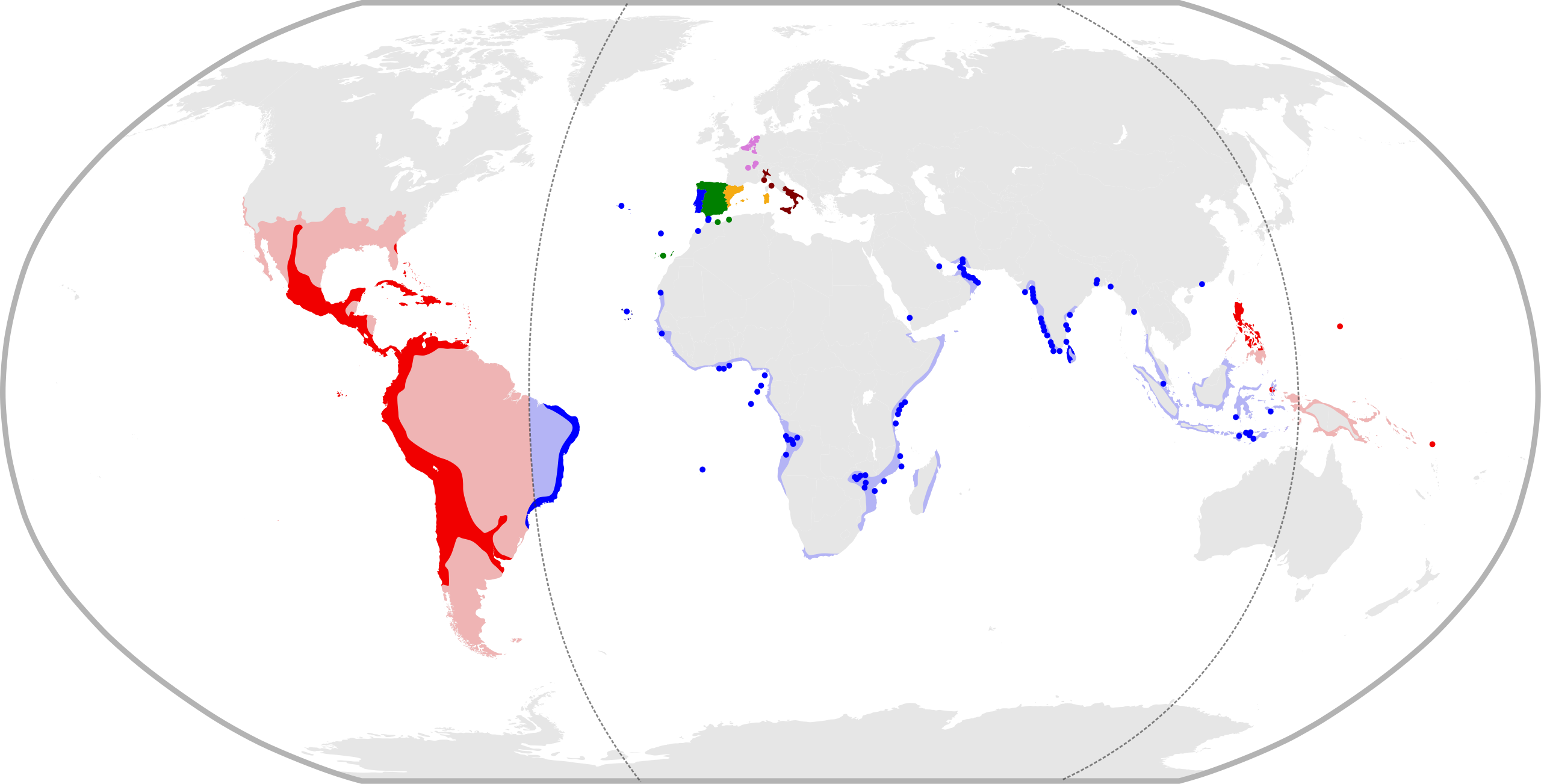
The territories that came under the Spanish monarch during the Iberian Union

After the crowns of Castile and Aragon united in 1469, modern Spain began to emerge as a great power. Besides conquering the Emirate of Granada and completing the "Reconquista", in the 16th century, Spain was in the vanguard of European global exploration and colonial expansion and the opening of trade routes across the oceans, with trade flourishing across the Atlantic Ocean between Spain and the Americas and across the Pacific Ocean between the Asia–Pacific and Mexico via the Philippines. Conquistadors toppled the Aztec, Inca, and Maya civilizations, and laid claim to vast stretches of land in North and South America. For a long time, the Spanish Empire dominated the oceans with its navy and ruled the battlefield with its infantry, the effective tercios. Spain enjoyed a cultural golden age in the 16th and 17th centuries as Europe's foremost power, with the largest economy of all nations during at least half of the 16th century.

From 1580 to 1640, the Spanish Empire and the Portuguese Empire were conjoined in a personal union of its Habsburg monarchs, during the period of the Iberian Union. However, the empires continued to be administered separately.

From the middle of the 16th century, silver and gold from the American mines increasingly financed the military capability of Habsburg Spain, then the foremost global power, in its long series of European, American, and North African wars. Until the loss of its American colonies in the 19th century, Spain maintained one of the largest empires in the world, even though it suffered from fluctuating military and economic fortunes from the 1640s onward. Confronted with new experiences, Spanish thinkers formulated some of the first modern ideas on natural law, sovereignty, international law, war, and economics, going so far as to question the legitimacy of imperialism, in related schools of thought collectively referred to as the School of Salamanca.

Constant contention with rival powers caused territorial, commercial, and religious conflict that contributed to the slow decline of Spanish power from the early 17th century, aggravated by both the General Crisis sweeping through Europe, as well as the collapse of the Habsburg Netherlands and ensuring Eighty Years' War, which would cripple Spain for decades. In the Mediterranean, Spain warred constantly with the Ottoman Empire; on the European continent, France eventually replaced Spain as the leading military power. Overseas, Spain was initially rivaled by Portugal, and later by the English and Dutch. In addition, English-, French-, and Dutch-sponsored privateering and piracy, over-extension of Spanish military commitments in its territories, increasing government corruption, and economic stagnation caused by military expenditures ultimately contributed to the empire's weakening.

After a century of decline from its status as Europe's most powerful country, Spain entered the War of the Spanish Succession, with its population divided between pro-Bourbon and pro-Habsburg factions, as Europe decided the country's fate. Spain's European empire was finally undone by the Peace of Utrecht (1713), which stripped Spain of its remaining territories in Italy and the Low Countries. Spain's fortunes improved thereafter, but it remained a second-rate power in European politics.

By the early 19th century, Spain maintained and enlarged its vast overseas empire, until the shock of the Peninsular War sparked declarations of autonomy in Charcas, Quito, Venezuela, New Granada, Buenos Aires, Paraguay and many more successive revolutions that concluded with the independence of the continental colonies of Spain in the New World between 1810 and 1826. The Battle of Boyacá (1819) would mark a turning point that allowed the creation of Gran Colombia, a revolutionary republic that would go on to expel Spanish colonial authorities from their remaining colonial possessions in Peru, aided by military forces from the United Provinces of the Río de la Plata marching from the south. After a series of battles, Spain lost its last colonial possessions in South America with the captures of Callao and Chiloé in 1826. From that point forward, although it would remain a strong country, Spain was not to be a great power again.

=== Polish–Lithuanian union and Commonwealth (1410–1701) ===
Polish Empire at its greatest extent, 1466

Polish Empire at its greatest extent, 1635

The union of the Kingdom of Poland and the Grand Duchy of Lithuania, formed in 1385, emerged as a major power in Central and Eastern Europe following its victory at the Battle of Grunwald in 1410. Poland–Lithuania covered a large territory in Central and Eastern Europe, making it the largest state in Europe at the time. Through its territorial possessions and vassal principalities and protectorates, its influence extended from the Baltic Sea to the Black Sea, reaching Livonia (present-day Estonia and Latvia) in the north, and Moldavia and Crimea in the south and southeast. In the 15th century the ruling Jagiellonian dynasty managed to place its members on the thrones of the neighbouring kingdoms of Bohemia and Hungary, becoming one of the most powerful houses in Europe.

The Polish–Lithuanian Commonwealth was one of the largest, most powerful, and most populous countries in 16th, 17th, and 18th century Europe. In fact, Poland was a major power that imposed its will on weaker neighbors. Its political structure was formed in 1569 by the Union of Lublin, which transformed the previous Polish–Lithuanian union into the Polish–Lithuanian Commonwealth, and lasted in this form until the adoption of the Constitution of May 3, 1791. In the 16th century, the area of the Rzeczpospolita reached almost 1 million km^{2}, with a population of 11 million. At that time, it was the third largest country in Europe, and the largest country of Western Christian Europe. Poland was a political, military and economic power. It was a country of religious freedom, confirmed by the Warsaw Confederation, one of the first European acts of its kind, which encouraged an influx of immigrants, including Armenian, Czech, Dutch, French, Greek, Jewish, and Scottish.

The Union possessed features unique among contemporary states. This political system, unusual for its time, stemmed from the ascendance of the szlachta noble class over other social classes and over the political system of monarchy. In time, the szlachta accumulated enough privileges (such as those established by the Nihil novi Act of 1505) that no monarch could hope to break the szlachta's grip on power. The Commonwealth's political system does not readily fit into a simple category; it may best be described as a melange of:

- confederation and federation, concerning the broad autonomy of its regions. It is, however, difficult to decisively classify the Commonwealth as either a confederation or a federation, as it had qualities of both.
- oligarchy, as only the szlachta—around 15% of the population—had political rights;
- democracy, since all the szlachta were equal in rights and privileges, and the Sejm could veto the king on important matters, including legislation (the adoption of new laws), foreign affairs, declaration of war, and taxation (changes of existing taxes or the levying of new ones). Also, the 9% of the Commonwealth population who enjoyed those political rights (the szlachta) was a substantially larger percentage than in majority European countries; note that in 1789 in France, only about 1% of the population had the right to vote, and in 1867 in the United Kingdom, only about 3%.
- elective monarchy, since the monarch, elected by the szlachta, was Head of State;
- constitutional monarchy, since the monarch was bound by pacta conventa and other laws, and the szlachta could disobey decrees of the king that they deemed illegal.

The Polish Golden Age, in the reigns of Sigismund I and Sigismund II, the last two Jagiellonian kings, and more generally the 16th century, is identified with the culture of the Polish Renaissance. This flowering had its material basis in the prosperity of the elites, both the landed nobility and the urban patriciate, at centers such as Kraków and Gdańsk. The University of Kraków became one of the leading centers of learning in Europe, and in Poland, Nicolaus Copernicus formulated a model of the universe that placed the Sun rather than Earth at its center, making a groundbreaking contribution, which sparked the Scientific Revolution in Europe.

Following the Union of Lublin, at various times, through personal unions and vassalages, Poland's sphere of influence reached Sweden and Finland in Northern Europe, the Danube in Southeastern Europe, and the Caribbean and West Africa. In a rather unique feat, Poland became a territorially extensive state largely not through war conquests, but rather through peaceful incorporation of territories, with the Polish–Lithuanian union formed voluntarily, and Prussia, Caffa in Crimea and Livonia voluntarily recognizing Polish sovereignty in 1454, 1462 and 1561, respectively, viewing Poland as a defender against either oppressive regimes, such as the Teutonic Order, or potential invaders such as Turkey and Russia.

Poland had turbulent relations with the neighboring powers of Russia, Sweden, and Turkey, which challenged Polish power in a series of wars. After victories in the Dimitriads (the Battle of Klushino, 1610), with Polish forces entering Moscow, Sigismund III's son, Prince Władysław of Poland, was briefly elected Tsar of Russia. The weakening of Poland was brought by the disastrous Russo-Swedish-Brandenburgian invasion of 1654–1660, yet Poland remained a great power. The victory of Polish-led forces at the Battle of Vienna in 1683 saved Austria from Ottoman conquest and marked the end of Ottoman advances into Europe. Poland's great power came to an end with the Swedish invasion of Poland of 1701–1706 during the Great Northern War, and from Stanislaus I onwards, successive kings were consistently elected in the geopolitical interests of foreign nations.

=== China (1683–1912) ===
Qing dynasty in 1820

The Qing dynasty was the last ruling dynasty of China, proclaimed in 1636 and collapsed in 1912 (with a brief, abortive restoration in 1917). It was preceded by the Ming dynasty and followed by the Republic of China. The dynasty was founded by the Manchu clan Aisin Gioro in what is today Northeast China (also known as "Manchuria"). Starting in 1644, it expanded into China proper and its surrounding territories. Complete pacification of China proper was accomplished around 1683 under the Kangxi Emperor. The multiethnic Qing Empire assembled the territorial base for modern China. It was the largest Chinese dynasty and in 1790 the fourth-largest empire in world history in terms of territorial size. With a population of 432 million in 1912, it was the world's most populous country at the time. The Qing dynasty also reached its economic peak in 1820, when it became the world's largest economy, contributing to around 30% of the world's GDP.

Originally, the Later Jin dynasty changed its official name to "Great Qing", meaning "clear" or "pellucid", in 1636. In 1644, Beijing was sacked by a coalition of rebel forces led by Li Zicheng, a minor Ming official who later proclaimed the Shun dynasty. The last Ming emperor, the Chongzhen Emperor, committed suicide when the city fell, marking the official end of the Ming dynasty. Qing forces then allied with Ming general Wu Sangui and seized control of Beijing to expel Shun forces from the city.

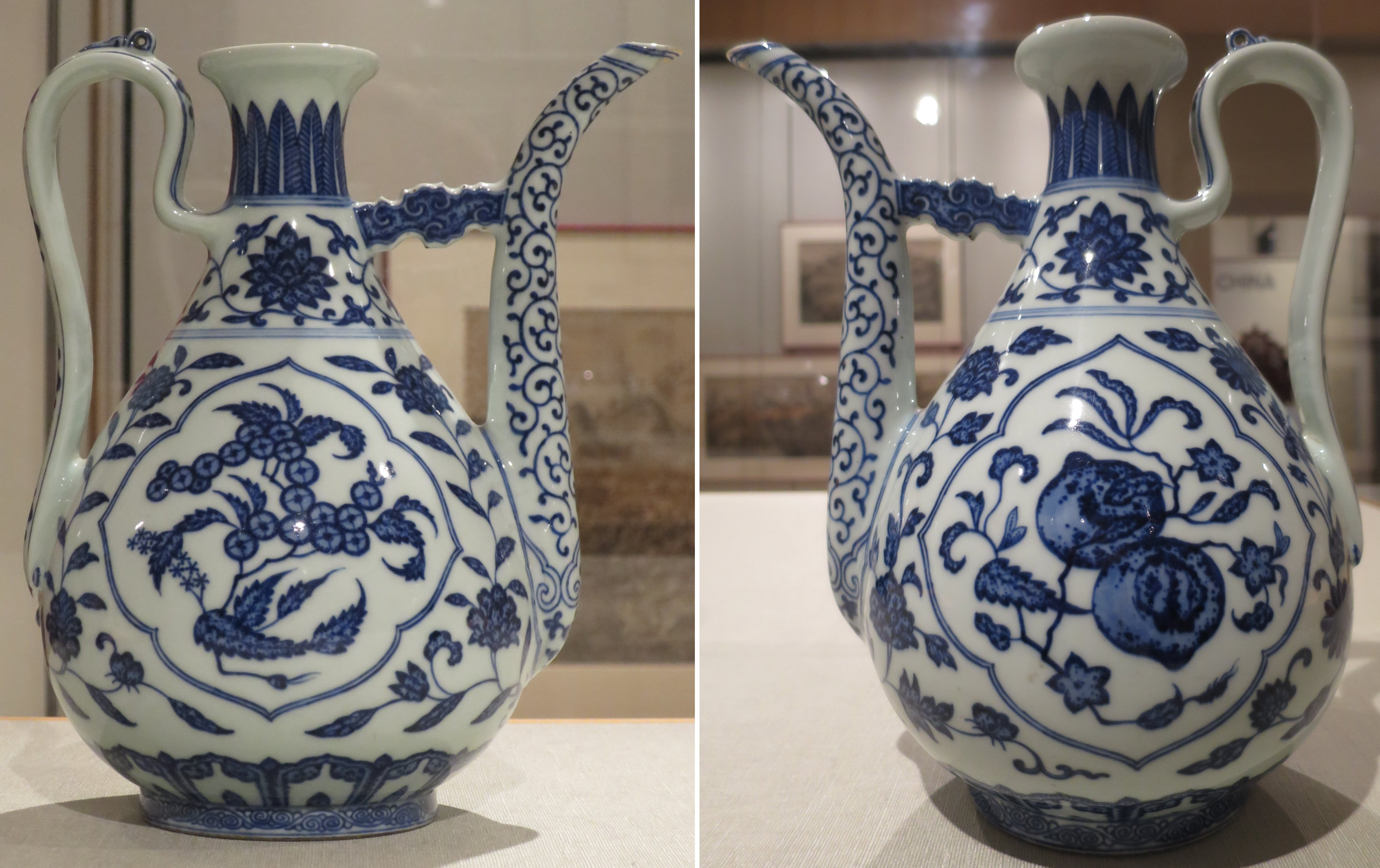
Examples of the high quality porcelain that was mass-produced during the High Qing era

The Qing dynasty reached its height during the reigns of the Kangxi Emperor, Yongzheng Emperor, and Qianlong Emperor. The Ten Great Campaigns and, in addition, the conquest of the western territories of the Mongols, Tibetans, and Muslims under the rule of the Qing were another factor of prosperity. The skillful rule of the era's emperors allowed for this success: rule through chiefdoms, in territories like Taiwan, allowed for the conquered peoples to retain their culture and be ruled by their own people, while the Qing Empire still possessed the ultimate control over its vast territory. These ruling tactics created little need or reason for the conquered to rebel. Another aspect of Manchu rule under the Qing Empire was its administration of modern-day China. The Mongols' attempt to rule may have failed because they attempted to rule from the outside. The High Qing emperors ruled from within, enabling them to obtain and retain stable, efficient control of the state.

A new generation of emperors combined the strengths of their culture with a degree of sinicization of the conquered cultures, aiming to achieve assimilation while retaining their own cultural identity. This was initiated with the Kangxi Emperor, who was in power at the initiation of the High Qing. As an emperor, he elevated the status of the Qing Empire through his passion for education, combined with his military expertise and his restructuring of the bureaucracy into a cosmopolitan one. His son and successor, the Yongzheng Emperor, ruled differently, using harsher, more brutal tactics, but possessed an unprecedented level of efficiency and commitment to the empire's betterment. The last successful emperor of the High Qing was the Qianlong Emperor who, following in the footsteps of his father and grandfather, was a well-rounded ruler who created the peak of the High Qing Empire. The unique and unprecedented ruling techniques of these three emperors, and the emphasis on multiculturalism fostered the productivity and success that lasted through the High Qing era.

A heavy revival of the arts was another characteristic of the High Qing Empire. Through commercialization, items such as porcelain were mass-produced and traded. Literature was emphasized as Imperial libraries were erected, and literacy rates of men and women both rose within the elite class. The significance of education and art in this era is that they created economic stimulation that would last for over fifty years. After the Qianlong Emperor's death, the dynasty faced changes in the world system, foreign instrusion, internal revolts, population growth, economic disruption, official corruption, and the reluctance of Confucian elites to change their mindsets. With peace and prosperity, the population rose to some 400 million, but taxes and government revenues remained low, soon leading to a fiscal crisis.

China, under the Qing dynasty, remained an unrecognized great power, as European powers did not, at the time, consider Asian nations to be their equals. Following the First and Second Opium Wars, where Britain and France imposed their will on the imperial dynasty, the government attempted to pursue a policy of radical reforms known as the Self-Strengthening Movement. While initially successful, the First Sino-Japanese War brought an abrupt end to the relative stability the Qing had managed to maintain, and was followed quickly by the Boxer Rebellion, until the Qing finally lost control in 1912.

=== Hindustan (1526–1818) ===
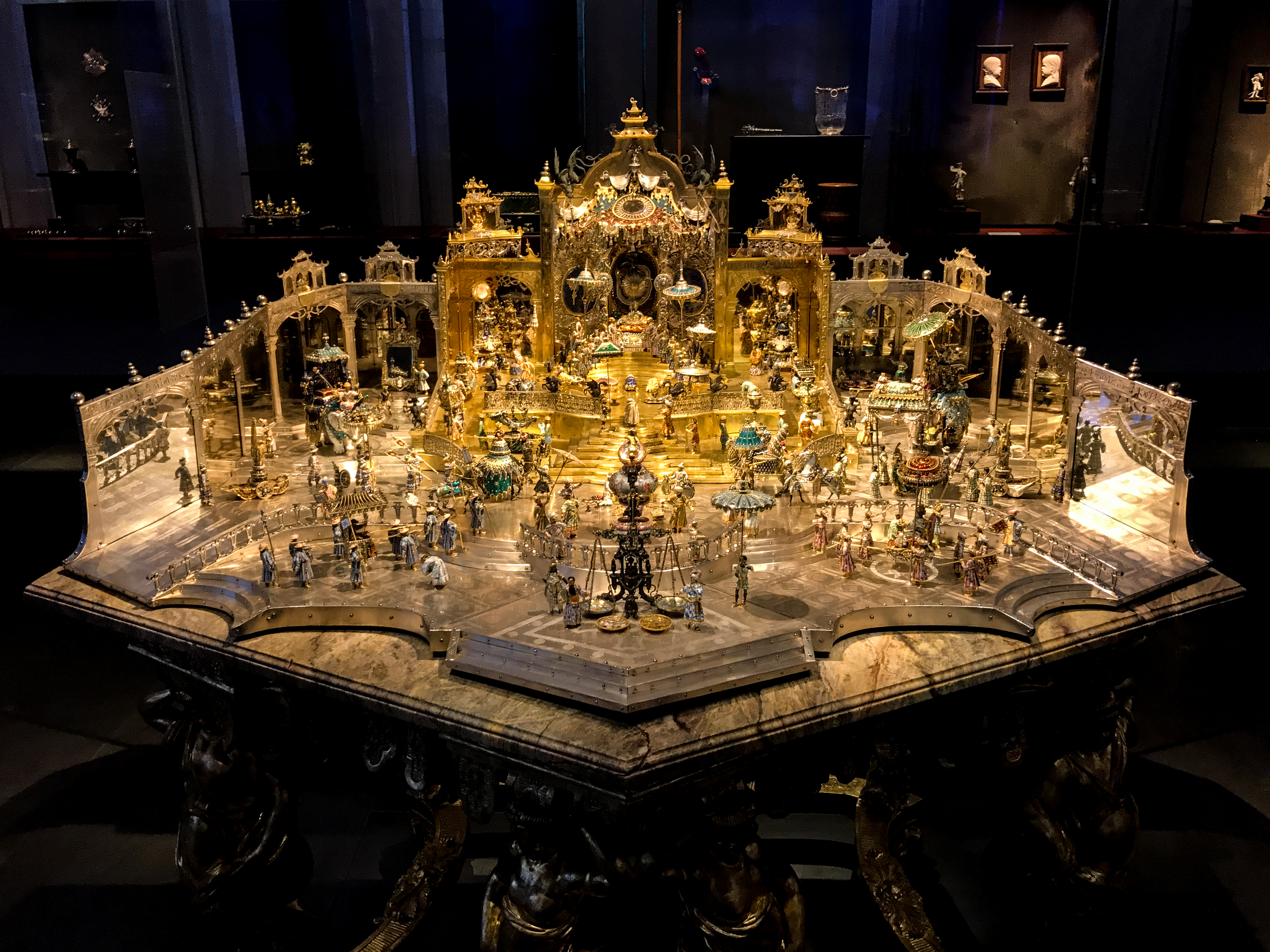
Model depicting the Court of Emperor Aurangzeb, by Johann Melchior Dinglinger

The Mughal Empire was a Persianate empire founded in 1526 by Babur of the Barlas clan with the backing of the neighboring Safavid Empire's Shah Ismail Safavi acting as Babur's suzerain. Babur's victories at the First Battle of Panipat and the Battle of Khanwa against the Delhi Sultanate and Rajput Confederation led to the formation of the Mughal Empire. Over the next centuries under Akbar, Jahangir, Shah Jahan, the Mughal Empire would grow in area and power and dominate the Indian subcontinent, reaching its maximum extent under Emperor Aurangzeb. This imperial structure lasted until 1720, shortly after the Mughal-Maratha Wars and the death of Aurangzeb, where the Mughals would gradually lose their influence to new powers such as the Maratha Empire and the Sikh Confederacy. The empire experienced a prolonged period of decline in the following century, notably culminating in the sacking of Delhi in 1739 and 1757. The country was made an unofficial protectorate of the Maratha Empire in 1784. After the Second Anglo-Maratha War, the British took over, until the Mughal Empire was formally dissolved by the British Raj after the Indian Rebellion of 1857. The Maratha Empire itself reached its territorial peak in 1760 before it entered its own period of decline starting with its defeat at the Third Battle of Panipat by Afghanistan in 1761. The death of young Peshwa Madhavrao I marked the end of the Peshwa's effective authority over other chiefs in the empire. The Indian subcontinent produced about 25% of the world's industrial output from the 1st millennium CE through the 18th century. The exchequer of the Emperor Aurangzeb reported an annual revenue of more than £100 million, or $450 million, making him one of the wealthiest monarchs in the world at the time. The empire had an extensive road network, which was vital to the economic infrastructure, built by a public works department set up by the Mughals, linking towns and cities across the empire, making trade easier to conduct.

The Mughals adopted and standardised the rupee (rupiya, or silver) and dam (copper) currencies introduced by Sur Emperor Sher Shah Suri during his brief rule. The Mughals minted coins with high purity, never dropping below 96%, and without debasement until the 1720s.

A major sector of the Mughal economy was agriculture. A variety of crops were grown, including food crops such as wheat, rice, and barley, and non-food cash crops such as cotton, indigo, and opium. By the mid-17th century, Indian cultivators began to extensively grow maize and tobacco imported from the Americas. The Mughal administration emphasized agrarian reform, started by Sher Shah Suri, the work of which Akbar adopted and furthered with more reforms. The civil administration was organised hierarchically based on merit, with promotions based on performance, exemplified by the common use of the seed drill among Indian peasants, and built irrigation systems across the empire, which produced much higher crop yields and increased the net revenue base, leading to increased agricultural production.

Manufacturing was also a significant contributor to the Mughal Economy. The Mughal empire produced about 25% of the world's industrial output up until the end of the 18th century. Manufactured goods and cash crops from the Mughal Empire were sold throughout the world. Key industries included textiles, shipbuilding, and steel. Processed products included cotton textiles, yarns, thread, silk, jute products, metalware, and foods such as sugar, oils and butter The Mughal Empire also took advantage of the demand of products from Mughal India in Europe, particularly cotton textiles, as well as goods such as spices, peppers, indigo, silks, and saltpeter (for use in munitions). European fashion, for example, became increasingly dependent on Mughal Indian textiles and silks. From the late 17th century to the early 18th century, Mughal India accounted for 95% of British imports from Asia, and the Bengal Subah province alone accounted for 40% of Dutch imports from Asia.

Indian cotton textiles were the most important manufactured goods in world trade in the 18th century, consumed worldwide, from the Americas to Japan. By the early 18th century, Mughal Indian textiles were clothing people across the Indian subcontinent, Southeast Asia, Europe, the Americas, Africa, and the Middle East.

=== Netherlands (1648–1795) ===
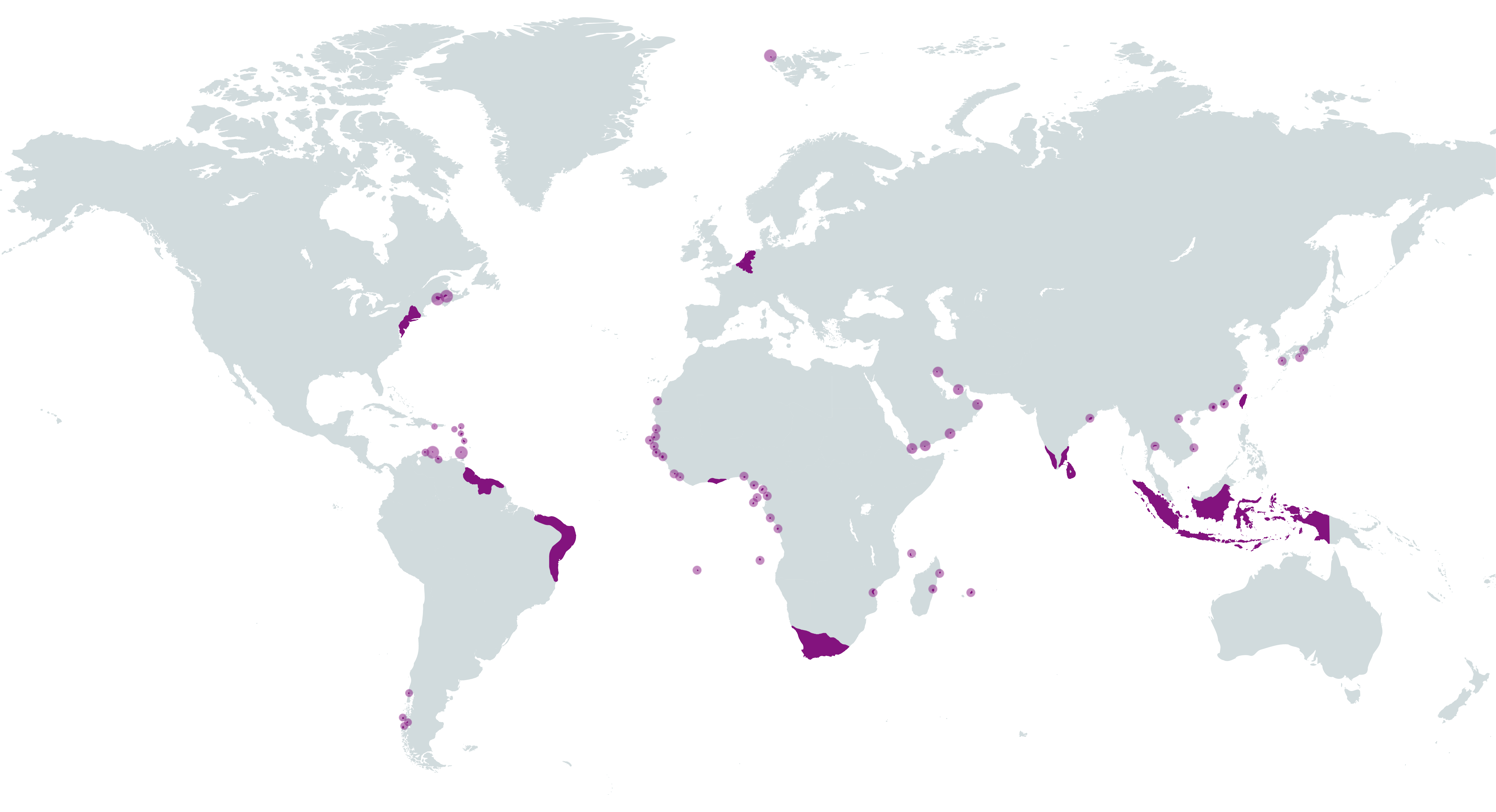
Lands held by The Netherlands

The Dutch Empire came to control various territories after the Dutch achieved independence from Spain in the late 16th century. The strength of their shipping industry and the expansion of trading routes between Europe and the Orient bolstered the overseas colonial empire, which lasted from the 17th to the 20th century. The Dutch initially built up colonial possessions based on indirect state-capitalist corporate colonialism, as small European trading companies often lacked the capital or workforce for large-scale operations. The States General chartered larger organizations—the Dutch West India Company and the Dutch East India Company—in the early seventeenth century to enlarge the scale of trading operations in the West Indies and the Orient respectively. These trading operations eventually became one of the largest and most extensive maritime trading companies at the time, and once held a virtual monopoly on strategic European shipping-routes westward through the Southern Hemisphere around South America through the Strait of Magellan, and eastward around Africa, past the Cape of Good Hope. The companies' domination of global commerce contributed greatly to a commercial revolution and a cultural flowering in the Netherlands of the 17th century, known as the Dutch Golden Age. During the Dutch Golden Age, Dutch trade, science, and art were among the most acclaimed in Europe. Dutch military power was at its height in the middle of the 17th century and in that era the Dutch navy was one of the biggest navies in the world.

By the middle of the 17th century, the Dutch had overtaken Portugal as the dominant player in the spice and silk trade. In 1652, they founded a colony at Cape Town on the coast of South Africa as a way-station for their ships on the route between Europe and Asia. After the first settlers spread out around the Company station, nomadic white livestock farmers, or Trekboers, moved farther afield, leaving the richer but limited coastal farming lands for the drier interior tableland. Between 1602 and 1796, many Europeans were sent to work in the Asian trade. The majority died of disease or made their way back to Europe, but some of them made the Indies their new home. Interaction between the Dutch and the native population mainly took place in Sri Lanka and the modern Indonesian Islands.

In their search for new trade passages between Asia and Europe, Dutch navigators explored and charted distant regions such as Australia, New Zealand, Tasmania, and parts of the eastern coast of North America. During the period of proto-industrialization, the empire received 50% of textiles and 80% of silks import from the India's Mughal Empire, chiefly from its most developed region known as Bengal Subah.

In the 18th century, the Dutch colonial empire began to decline as a result of the Fourth Anglo-Dutch War of 1780–1784, in which the Dutch Republic lost a number of its colonial possessions and trade monopolies to the British Empire, along with the conquest of the Mughal Bengal at the Battle of Plassey by the East India Company. Nevertheless, major portions of the empire survived until the advent of global decolonisation following World War II, namely the East Indies and Dutch Guiana. Three former colonial territories in the West Indies islands around the Caribbean Sea—Aruba, Curaçao, and Sint Maarten—remain as constituent countries represented within the Kingdom of the Netherlands.

=== Sweden (1611–1709) ===
Formation of the Swedish Empire, 1560–1660

Sweden emerged as a great European power under Axel Oxenstierna and King Gustavus Adolphus. As a result of acquiring territories seized from Russia and the Polish–Lithuanian Commonwealth, as well as its involvement in the Thirty Years' War, Sweden found itself transformed into the leading power of the Baltic Sea and the leader of Lutheranism. Despite not being a populous country, Sweden has achieved the status of a dominant power in northern Europe due to its efficient administration, a near-monopoly on copper production in Europe, a strong arms industry, and a robust, innovative army with capable leaders. The mid-17th and early 18th centuries were Sweden's most successful years as a great power.

During the Thirty Years' War, Sweden sought to conquer land from the Holy Roman Empire. After its defeat in the Battle of Nördlingen (1634), Sweden was left with only a couple of territories in present-day northern Germany. After France intervened on Sweden's side, the tide shifted in its favor. As the war continued, the civilian and military death toll grew, and when it was over, it led to severe depopulation in the German states. Although exact population figures are unavailable, historians estimate that the Holy Roman Empire's population fell by one-third as a result of the war. Sweden had seats in the Imperial Diet of the Holy Roman Empire, and was able to interfere in its politics. Sweden's involvement in the Thirty Years' War weakened Imperial authority and delayed the unification of German states, which occurred only in the 19th century.

Sweden controlled most of the Baltic Sea, where its only notable rival in the 17th century remained Poland, therefore Sweden initiated several invasions of Poland in an effort to conquer Polish coastal regions as well, however, except for the capture of central Livonia with Riga in the 1620s, without lasting success. Other major rivals of Sweden in the struggle for hegemony in Northern Europe were Denmark and Russia. During the Northern War of 1655–1660, Sweden even made unsuccessful attempts to annex Denmark, partition Poland, and unite with Lithuania to create a stronger Baltic bulwark against Russia.

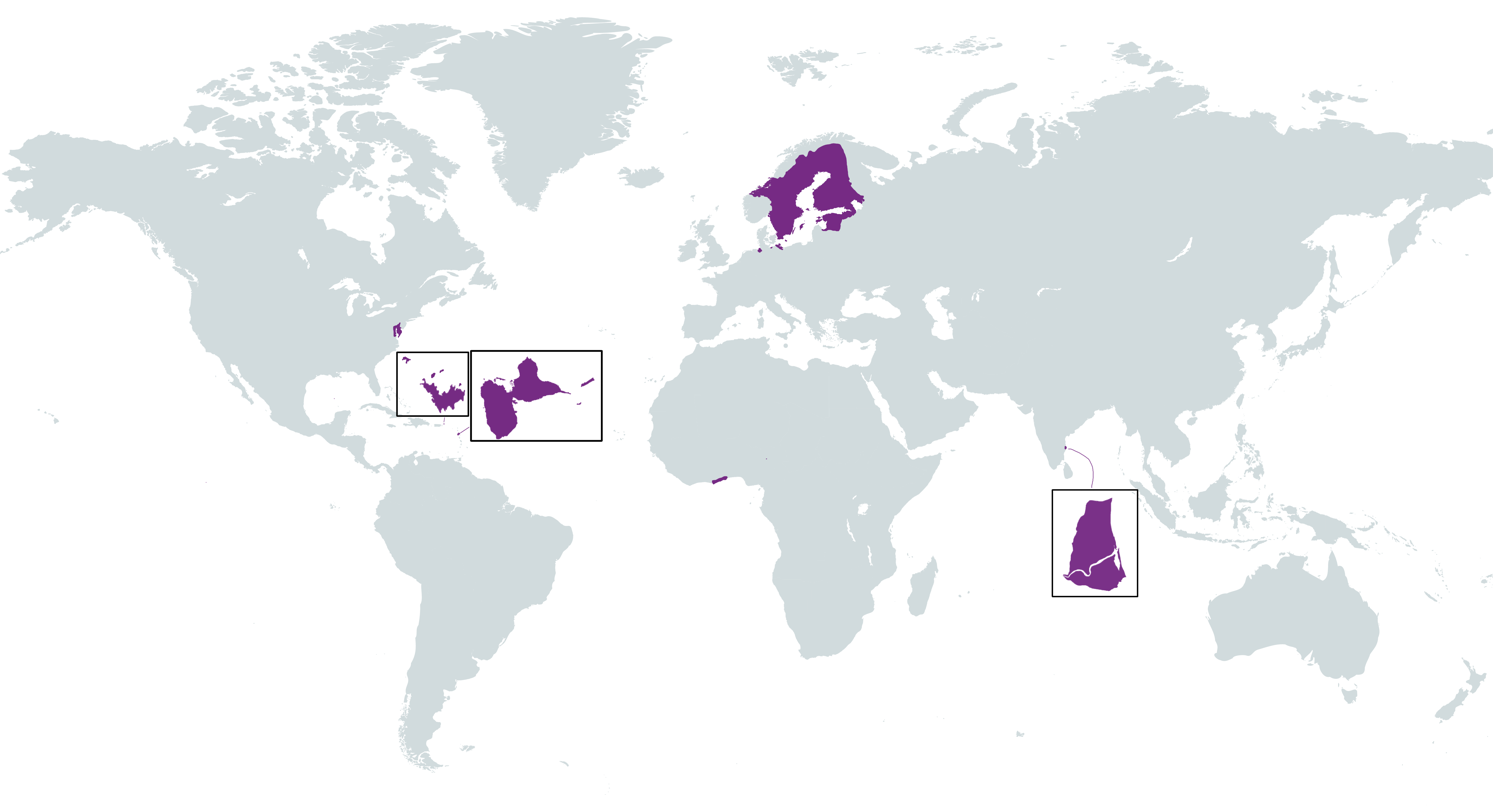
Swedish colonial empire

Sweden also had colonial possessions as a minor colonial Empire that existed from 1638 to 1663 and later from 1784 to 1878. Sweden founded overseas colonies, principally in the New World. New Sweden was founded in the valley of the Delaware River in 1638, and Sweden later laid claim to some Caribbean islands. A string of Swedish forts and trading posts was constructed along the coast of West Africa as well, but these were not designed for Swedish settlers. Sweden even established its own East India Company for trade with Asia that operated from 1731 to 1813, and occupied the South Indian city of Parangipettai for one month in 1733 before it was retaken by Britain and France.

Sweden reached its largest territorial extent during the rule of Charles X (1622–1660) after the treaty of Roskilde in 1658. After half a century of expansive warfare, the Swedish economy had deteriorated. It would become the lifetime task of Charles' son, Charles XI (1655–1697), to rebuild the economy and refit the army. His legacy to his son, the coming ruler of Sweden Charles XII, was one of the finest arsenals in the world, with a large standing army and a great fleet. Sweden's largest threat at this time, Russia, had a larger army but was far behind in both equipment and training. The Swedish army crushed the Russians at the Battle of Narva in 1700, one of the first battles of the Great Northern War. The campaign had a successful opening for Sweden, which came to occupy half of Poland, and Charles laid claim to the Polish throne. But after a long march exposed by cossack raids, the Russian Tsar Peter the Great's scorched-earth techniques and the very cold Russian climate, the Swedes stood weakened with shattered confidence and enormously outnumbered by the Russian army at Poltava. The decisive Russian victory at the Battle of Poltava (1709) marked the end of Sweden as a great power.

== Late modern era great powers ==
=== France (1214–) ===
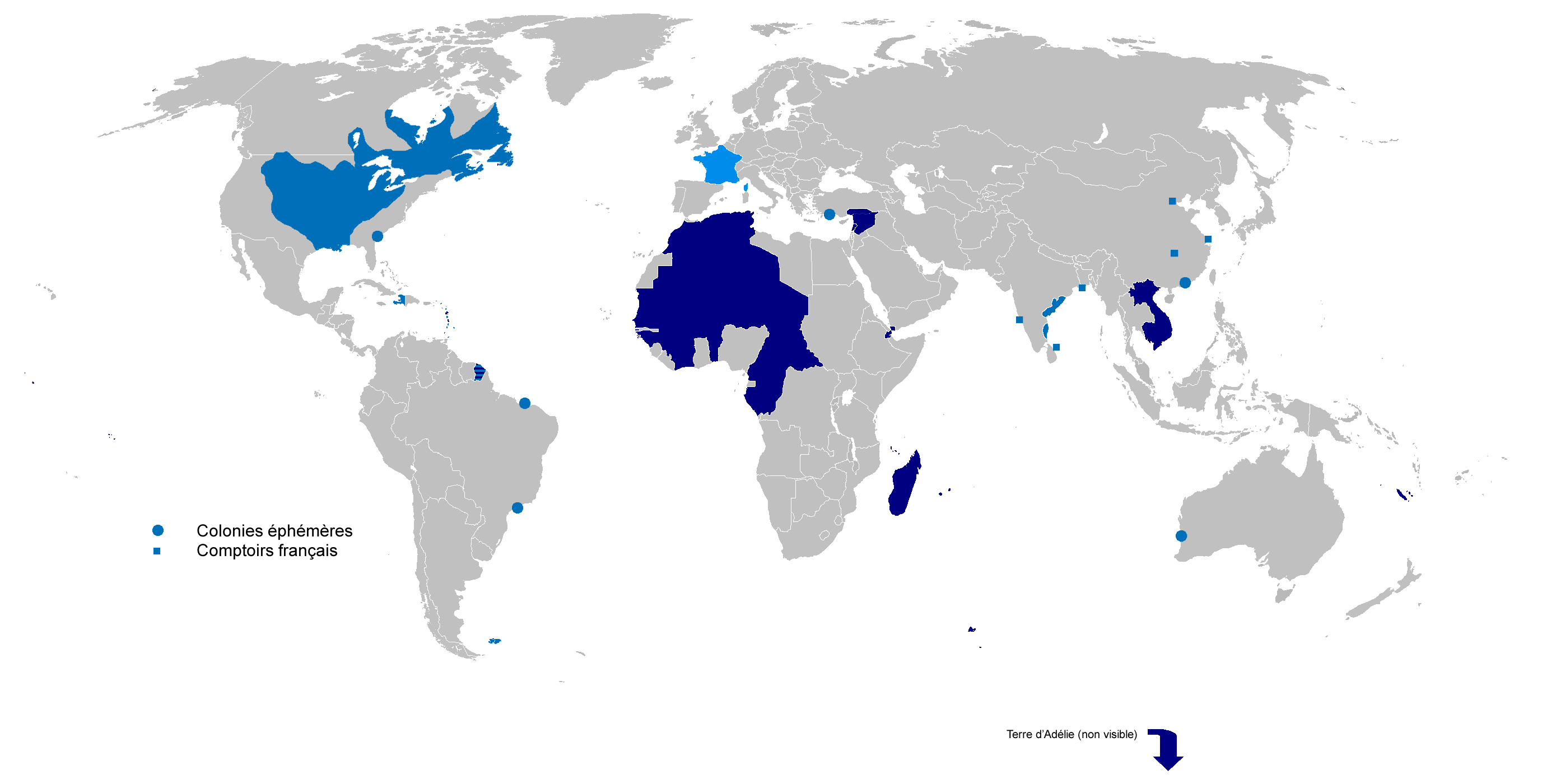
The French empire with its colonies (dark blue) and occupied territories (light blue) in 1812

France maintained its status throughout the modern era as a dominant empire with numerous colonies around the world. The French colonial empire is the set of territories outside Europe that were under French rule primarily from the 16th century to the late 1960s (some see the French control of places such as New Caledonia as a continuation of that colonial empire). The first French colonial empire reached its peak in 1680, with over 10,000,000 km^{2} (3,900,000 sq mi) of territory, which at the time was the second-largest in the world, behind the Spanish Empire. In the 19th and 20th centuries, the French colonial empire was the second-largest in the world, behind the British Empire. At its height in the 1920s and 1930s, including metropolitan France, the total area under French sovereignty reached 13,500,000 km^{2} (5,200,000 sq mi), representing 10% of Earth's total land area. The total area of the French colonial empire, with the first (mainly in the Americas and Asia) and second (mainly in Africa and Asia), combined, reached 24,000,000 km2 (9,300,000 sq mi), the second-largest ever overall.

France began to establish colonies in North America, the Caribbean, and India, following Spanish and Portuguese successes during the Age of Discovery, in rivalry with Britain for supremacy. A series of wars with Britain during the 18th and early 19th centuries, which France lost, ended its colonial ambitions on these continents and, with them, what some historians term the "first" French colonial empire. In the 19th century, France established a new empire in Africa and Southeast Asia. Some of these colonies lasted beyond the Second World War and were integrated into France proper as overseas territories.

=== United Kingdom (1588–) ===
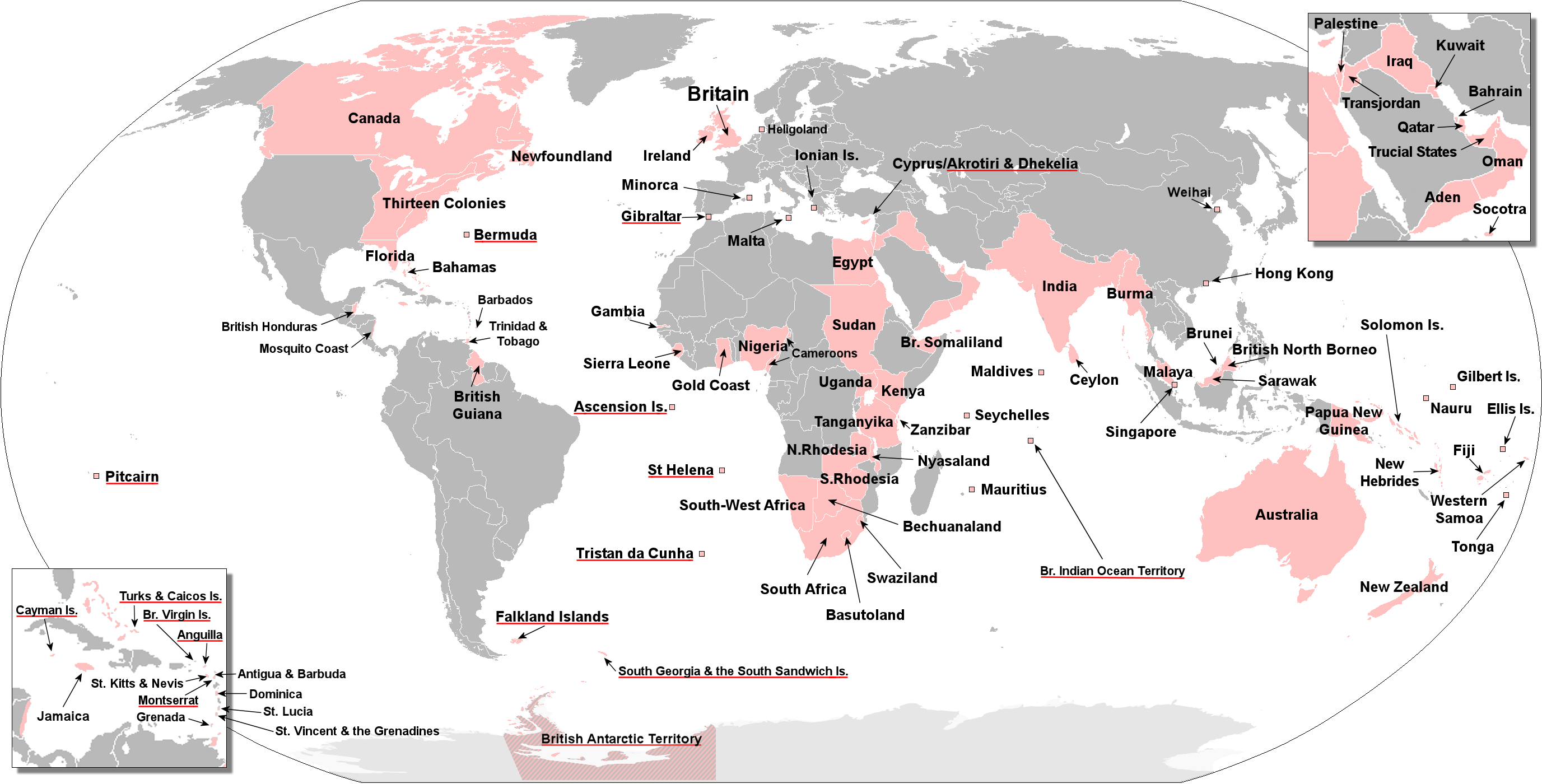
British Empire, 1600–present. By 1920, it had become the largest empire in history, comprising approximately 25% of the world's land area and 25% of its population.

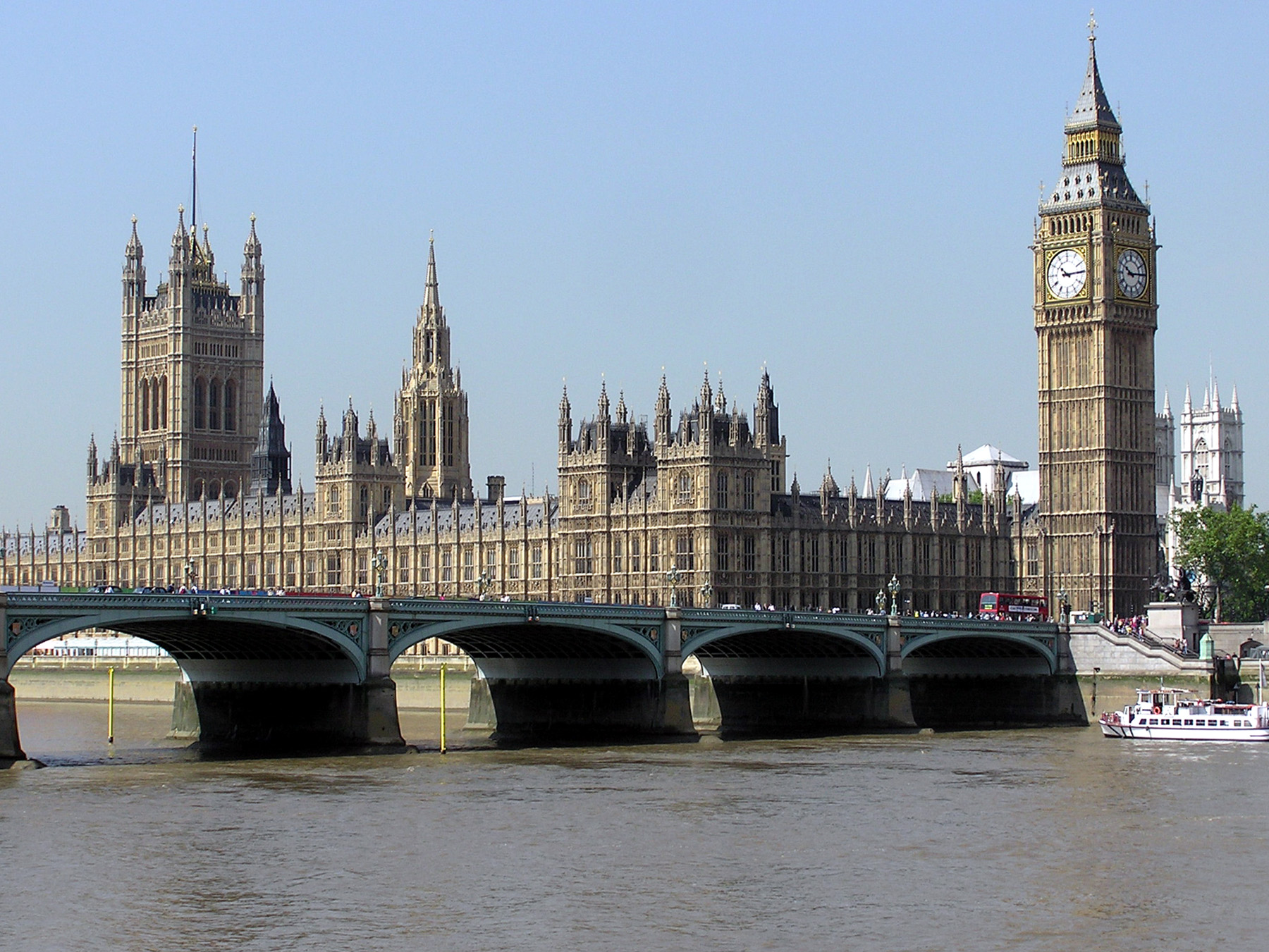
The Palace of Westminster, with Elizabeth Tower and Westminster Bridge

The British Empire in the modern era was built primarily in Asia, the Middle East, and Africa. It included colonies in Canada, the Caribbean, and India, South Africa, and shortly thereafter began the settlement of Australia and New Zealand. Following France's 1815 defeat in the Napoleonic Wars, Great Britain took possession of many more overseas territories in Africa and Asia. It established an informal empire based on free trade in South America, Persia, and elsewhere.

At its height, the British Empire was the largest empire in history and, for over a century, was the foremost global power. In 1815–1914, the Pax Britannica was the most powerful unitary authority in history due to the Royal Navy's unprecedented naval predominance.

During the 19th century, the United Kingdom was the first country in the world to industrialize and embrace free trade, giving birth to the Industrial Revolution. The rapid industrial growth after the conquests of the wealthy Mughal Bengal transformed Great Britain into the world's largest industrial and financial power. In contrast, the world's largest navy gave it undisputed control of the seas and international trade routes. This advantage helped the British Empire, after a mid-century liberal reaction against empire-building, to grow faster than ever before. The Victorian empire colonised large parts of Africa, including such territories as South Africa, Egypt, Kenya, Sudan, Nigeria, and Ghana, most of Oceania, colonies in the Far East, such as Singapore, Malaysia, and Hong Kong, and took control over the whole Indian subcontinent, making it the largest empire in the world.

After victory in the First World War, the Empire gained control of territories such as Tanzania and Namibia from the German Empire, and Iraq and Palestine (including the Transjordan) from the Ottoman Empire. By this point in 1920, the British Empire had become the largest empire in history, controlling approximately 25% of the world's land area and 25% of its population. It covered about 36.6 million km^{2} (14.1 million sq mi). Because of its magnitude, it was often referred to as "the empire on which the sun never sets".

The political, social, and economic changes and disruptions in the United Kingdom and throughout the world caused by the First World War, followed only two decades later by the Second World War, led the Empire to break up as colonies were gradually granted independence. Much of the reason the Empire ceased was that, by the mid-20th century, many colonies were no longer as undeveloped or as dependent as they had been at the arrival of British control. Social changes worldwide in the first half of the 20th century gave rise to national identity. The British Government, reeling from the economic cost of two successive world wars and changing social attitudes towards being an empire, felt it could no longer afford to maintain it if the country were to recover economically, pay for the newly created welfare state, and fight the newly emerged Cold War with the Soviet Union.

The influence and power of the British Empire dropped dramatically after the Second World War, especially after the Partition of India in 1947 and the Suez Crisis in 1956. The Commonwealth of Nations is the successor to the Empire, where the United Kingdom is an equal member with all other states.

=== Russia and Soviet Union (1703–) ===
Russian Empire (green) as of 1866, at the time of the maximum territorial expansion of the empire

The Russian Empire as a state existed from 1721 until it was declared a republic in 1917. The Russian Empire was the successor to the Tsardom of Russia and the predecessor of the Soviet Union. It was one of the largest empires in world history, surpassed in landmass only by the British and Mongolian empires. At one point in 1866, it stretched from Northern Europe across Asia and into North America.

At the beginning of the 19th century, the Russian Empire extended from the Arctic Ocean in the north to the Black Sea in the south, from the Baltic Sea in the west to the Pacific Ocean in the east. With 125.6 million subjects registered by the 1897 census, it had the third-largest population in the world at the time, after Qing China and the British Empire. Like all empires, it represented significant disparities in economic, ethnic, and religious positions. Its government, ruled by the Emperor, was one of the last absolute monarchies in Europe. Before the outbreak of World War I in August 1914, Russia was one of the five major Great Powers of Europe.

The Warsaw Pact, a collective defense treaty signed in Warsaw, Poland, between the Soviet Union and seven other Eastern Bloc socialist republics of Central and Eastern Europe in May 1955, during the Cold War

Following the October Revolution that overthrew the Russian Republic, the Soviet Union was established by the Communist Party of the Soviet Union. The Soviet Union began to resemble the old Russian Empire in landmass, with its territory stretching from Eastern Europe to Siberia, and from Northern Europe to Central Asia.

After the death of the first Soviet leader, Vladimir Lenin, in 1924, Joseph Stalin eventually won a power struggle and led the country through large-scale industrialization, a command economy, and political repression. On 23 August 1939, after unsuccessful efforts to form an anti-fascist alliance with Western powers, the Soviets signed the non-aggression agreement with Nazi Germany. After the start of World War II, the formally neutral Soviets invaded and annexed territories of several Central and Eastern European states, including eastern Poland, the Baltic states, northeastern Romania and eastern Finland.

In June 1941 the Germans invaded, opening the largest and bloodiest theater of war in history. Soviet war casualties accounted for the majority of Allied casualties of the conflict in the process of acquiring the upper hand over Axis forces at intense battles such as Stalingrad and Kursk. Soviet forces eventually captured Berlin and won World War II in Europe on 9 May 1945. The territory overtaken by the Red Army became satellite states of the Eastern Bloc. The Cold War emerged in 1947, where the Eastern Bloc confronted the Western Bloc, which would unite in the North Atlantic Treaty Organization in 1949.

Following Stalin's death in 1953, a period known as de-Stalinization and the Khrushchev Thaw occurred under the leadership of Nikita Khrushchev. The country developed rapidly as millions of peasants were moved to industrial cities. The USSR took an early lead in the Space Race with the first ever satellite and the first human spaceflight and the first probe to land on another planet, Venus. In the 1970s, there was a brief period of détente in relations with the United States, but tensions resumed when the Soviet Union deployed troops to Afghanistan in 1979. The war drained economic resources and was matched by an escalation of American military aid to Mujahideen fighters.

In the mid-1980s, the last Soviet leader, Mikhail Gorbachev, sought to further reform and liberalize the economy through his policies of glasnost and perestroika. The goal was to preserve the Communist Party while reversing economic stagnation. The Cold War ended during his tenure, and in 1989, Warsaw Pact countries in Eastern Europe overthrew their respective Marxist–Leninist regimes. Strong nationalist and separatist movements broke out across the USSR. Gorbachev initiated a referendum—boycotted by the Baltic republics, Armenia, Georgia, and Moldova—which resulted in a majority of participating citizens voting to preserve the Union as a renewed federation. In August 1991, a coup d'état was attempted by Communist Party hardliners. It failed, with Russian President Boris Yeltsin playing a high-profile role in confronting the coup. The main result was the Communist Party's ban. The republics led by Russia and Ukraine declared independence. On 25 December 1991, Gorbachev resigned. All the republics emerged from the dissolution of the Soviet Union as independent post-Soviet states. The Russian Federation (formerly the Russian SFSR) assumed the Soviet Union's rights and obligations and is recognized as the Soviet Union's continued legal personality in international affairs.

The Soviet Union produced many significant social and technological achievements and innovations regarding military power. It boasted the world's second-largest economy and the largest standing military. The USSR was recognized as one of the five nuclear weapons states. It was a founding permanent member of the United Nations Security Council as well as a member of the OSCE, the WFTU and the leading member of the Council for Mutual Economic Assistance and the Warsaw Pact.

Before its dissolution, the USSR had maintained its status as a world superpower alongside the United States for four decades after World War II. Sometimes also called "the Soviet Empire", it exercised its hegemony in Central and Eastern Europe and worldwide with military and economic strength, proxy conflicts and influence in developing countries and funding of scientific research, especially in space technology and weaponry.

=== United States (1848–) ===
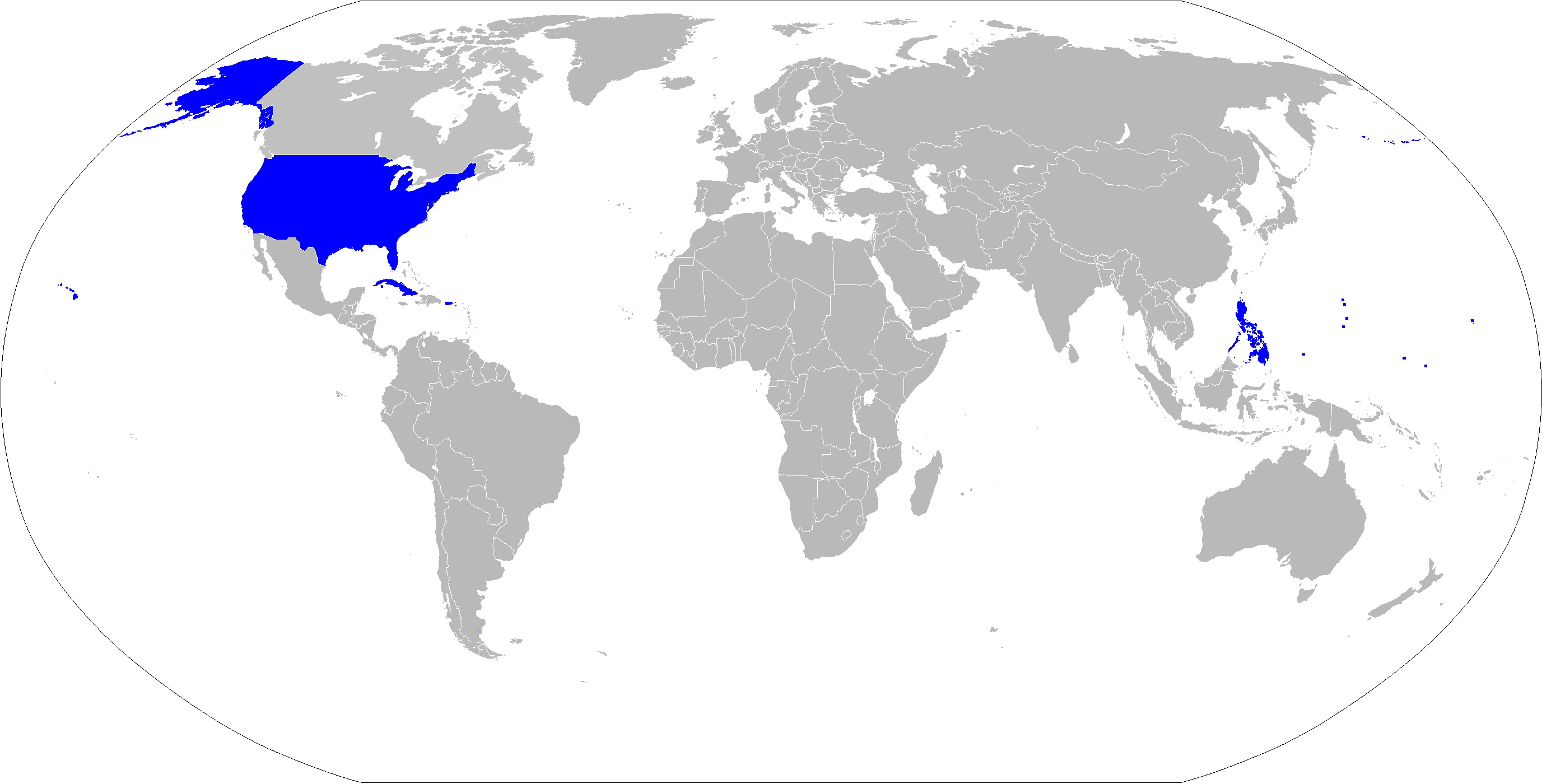
United States territory at its largest

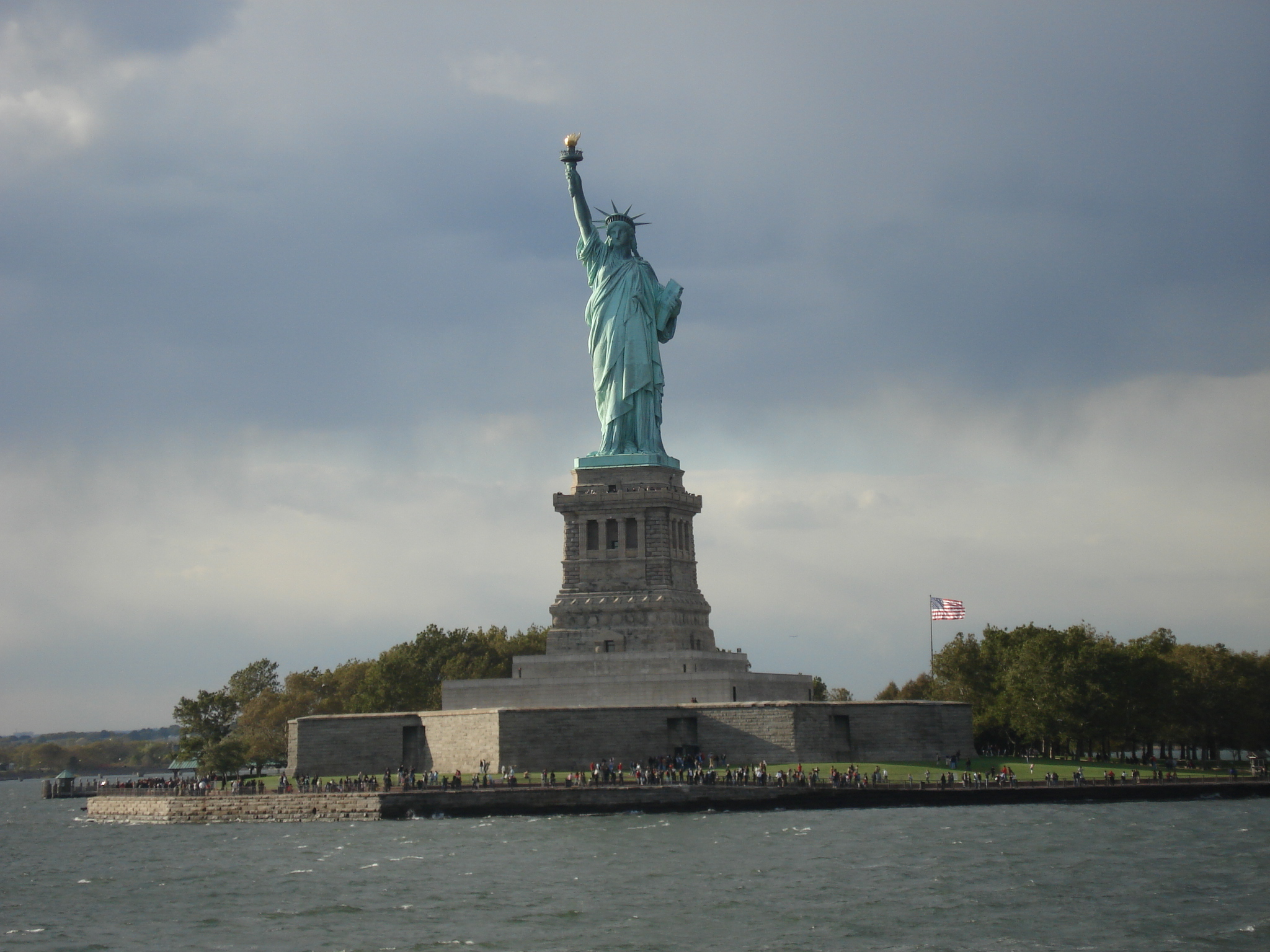
The Statue of Liberty, a symbol of American culture

The United States has exercised and continues to exercise worldwide economic, cultural, and military influence.

Founded in 1776 by thirteen coastal colonies that declared their independence from Great Britain, the United States began its western expansion following the end of the American Revolutionary War and the recognition of U.S. sovereignty in the 1783 Treaty of Paris. The treaty bequeathed to the nascent republic all land between the Appalachian Mountains and the Mississippi River, and Americans began migrating there in large numbers at the end of the 18th Century, resulting in the displacement of Native American cultures, often through native peoples' forcible deportation and violent wars of eviction. These efforts at expansion were greatly strengthened by the 1787 Constitutional Convention, which led to the ratification of the United States Constitution and transformed the U.S. from a loose confederation of semi-autonomous states into a federal system with a strong national core. In 1803, the United States acquired Louisiana from France, doubling the country's size and extending its borders to the Rocky Mountains.

American power and population grew rapidly, so that by 1823, President James Monroe felt confident enough to issue his Monroe Doctrine, which warned European powers against further territorial seizures in North America. This was the beginning of the U.S.'s emergence as a regional power in North America. That process was confirmed in the Mexican–American War of 1846–1848, in which the United States invaded Mexico to protect Texas and acquire California. The war included the deployment of U.S. forces into Mexico, the taking of Veracruz by sea, and the occupation of Mexico City by American troops (which finally resulted in Mexico's defeat). In the peace treaty (Treaty of Guadelupe Hidalgo) that followed, the U.S. annexed the northern half of Mexico, comprising what is now the Southwestern United States. During the course of the war, the United States also negotiated by treaty the acquisition of the Oregon Territory's southern half from Great Britain. In 1867, William H. Seward, the U.S. Secretary of State, negotiated the purchase of Alaska from the Russian Empire. Congress defeated President Ulysses Grant's scheme to annex the Dominican Republic. The United States defeated Spain in the Spanish–American War in 1898, and gained the possessions of Cuba, Puerto Rico, and the Philippines. The independent republic of Hawaii was annexed in 1898. The United States became a major victorious power in both World Wars and a major economic power after World War I had tired out the European powers.

=== Italy (1871–) ===
Every territory ever controlled by the Italian Empire at some point in time during World War II. Kingdom of Italy (dark green), Italian colonial empire (light green), and Italian-occupied territories (grey).

Modern Italy was unified from a collection of small states over several decades during the modern era. The Kingdom of Italy was proclaimed in 1861, and the Risorgimento was only truly completed by 1871, with the capture of Rome and its designation as the kingdom's capital city.

The Italian colonial empire was created after Italy joined other European powers in establishing colonies overseas during the "scramble for Africa". By this time, France, Spain, Portugal, Britain, and the Netherlands had already carved out large empires over several hundred years. One of the last remaining areas open to colonization was on the African continent.

By the outbreak of World War I in 1914, Italy had annexed Eritrea and Somalia. It had wrested control of portions of the Ottoman Empire, including Libya, though it was defeated in its attempt to conquer Ethiopia. The Fascist regime under Italian dictator Benito Mussolini, which came to power in 1922, sought to expand the empire further. Ethiopia was successfully taken, four decades after the previous failure, and Italy's European borders were expanded. An official "Italian Empire" was proclaimed on 9 May 1936 following the conquest of Ethiopia. Before the outbreak of World War II, Italy boasted the fifth-largest economy in Europe and the seventh in the world.

Italy sided with Nazi Germany during World War II, but Britain soon captured Italy's overseas colonies. By the time Italy itself was invaded in 1943, its empire had ceased to exist. On 8 September 1943, the fascist regime collapsed, Mussolini was arrested, and the country signed an armistice with the Allies. Following this, Germany invaded Northern Italy to disarm Italian forces and secure their southern border. A civil war then broke out between the Italian Social Republic, a rump state led by Mussolini under German pressure and supported by Axis forces, and the now-Allied Kingdom of Italy, aided by the Italian resistance movement and supported by Allied forces. Italian naval presence increased, no longer having to face the British and American navies, and the Italian Navy undertook missions in Asia against the Japanese. Estimates based on government data show that Italy suffered almost a hundred thousand military casualties following the armistice. Unlike the other two major Axis powers, following the war, Italy was not occupied, its army was not limited, and it was allowed to keep its government, preserving much of its influence and independence.

=== Austrian Empire and Austria-Hungary (1714–1918) ===
After the War of the Spanish Succession, Habsburg Austria, which had already controlled other Central European lands such as Bohemia, Hungary and Croatia, acquired the Italian lands of Milan, Mantua, Naples and Sardinia as well as the Austrian Netherlands from the declining Spanish Empire. It later briefly acquired Sicily after the War of the Quadruple Alliance as well as the Balkan lands of Serbia and Oltenia after the Austro–Turkish War. In the second half of the 18th century, it participated in the Partitions of Poland by annexing Galicia, and even briefly ventured into overseas colonialism in Asia. After Napoleon dissolved the Holy Roman Empire, the Imperial Crown and title of Holy Roman Emperor was directly transferred to the Austrian territories, most of which lay outside of the German Confederation.

The Habsburg Empire became one of the key powers in Europe after the Napoleonic Wars, with a sphere of influence stretching over Central Europe, Germany, and Italy. During the second half of the 19th century, the Habsburgs could not prevent the unification of Italy and lost their preeminent position among the German states to Prussia, which would soon unify Germany. Eventually, the complex internal power struggle resulted in the establishment of a so-called dual monarchy between Austria and Hungary. Austria-Hungary maintained a strong economy, and its vast population gave it the industrial capacity and workforce to compete with other European powers.

Following the defeat and dissolution of the monarchy after the First World War, both Austria and Hungary became independent and self-governing countries (First Austrian Republic, Kingdom of Hungary). Other political entities emerged from the destruction of the Great War including Poland, Czechoslovakia, and the Kingdom of Serbs, Croats, and Slovenes.

=== Prussia and Germany (1763–1918, 1933–1945) ===
Prussia in Europe at its greatest extent in 1870

The Kingdom of Prussia attained its greatest importance in the 18th and 19th centuries, when it conquered various territories previously held by Sweden, Austria, Poland, France, Denmark, and various minor German principalities. It became a European great power under the reign of Frederick II of Prussia (1740–1786). It dominated Northern Germany politically, economically, and in terms of population, and played a key role in the unification of Germany in 1871.

After the territorial acquisitions of the Congress of Vienna (1815), the Kingdom of Prussia became the only great power with a majority German-speaking population. During the 19th century, Chancellor Otto von Bismarck pursued a policy of uniting the German principalities into a "Lesser Germany" which would exclude the Austrian Empire. Prussia was the core of the North German Confederation formed in 1867, which became part of the German Empire or Deutsches Reich in 1871 when the southern German states, excluding Austria, were added.

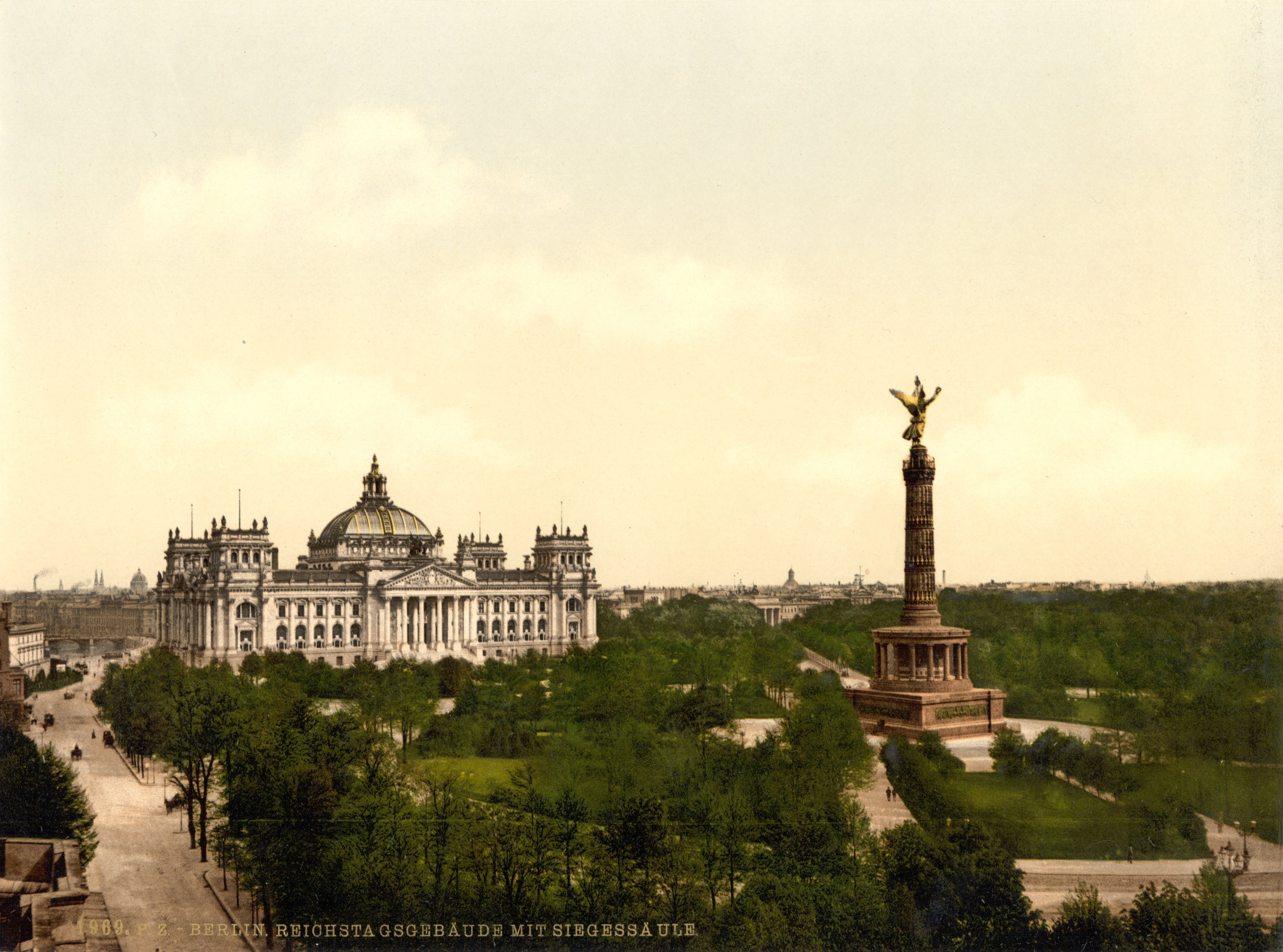
Reichstag in Berlin, 1900

After 1850, the states of Germany had rapidly become industrialized, with particular strengths in coal, iron (and later steel), chemicals, and railways. In 1871, Germany had a population of 41 million; by 1913, it had increased to 68 million. A largely rural collection of states in 1815, the now-united Germany became predominantly urban. The success of German industrialization manifested itself in two ways since the early 20th century: The German factories were larger and more modern than their British and French counterparts. During its 47 years of existence, the German Empire became the industrial, technological, and scientific giant of Europe, and by 1913, Germany was the largest economy in Continental Europe and the third-largest in the world. Germany built up the longest railway network of Europe, the world's strongest army, and a fast-growing industrial base. Starting very small in 1871, in a few decades, the navy became second only to Britain's Royal Navy, as Germany planned to match it. After the removal of Otto von Bismarck by Wilhelm II in 1890, the empire embarked on Weltpolitik – a bellicose new course that ultimately contributed to the outbreak of World War I.

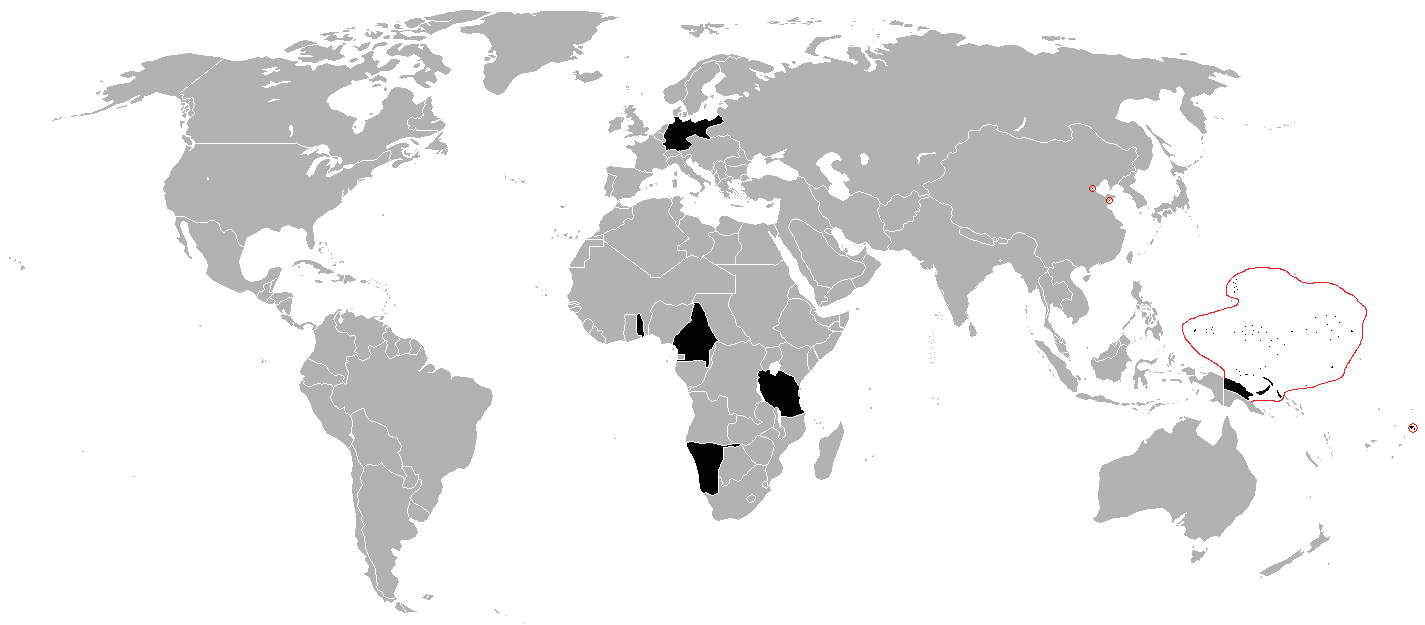
German colonies in 1914

Wilhelm II wanted Germany to have her "place in the sun", like Britain, which he constantly wished to emulate or rival. With German traders and merchants already active worldwide, he encouraged colonial efforts in Africa and the Pacific ("new imperialism"), causing the German Empire to vie with other European powers for remaining "unclaimed" territories. With the encouragement or at least the acquiescence of Britain, which at this stage saw Germany as a counterweight to her old rival France, Germany acquired German Southwest Africa (modern Namibia), German Kamerun (modern Cameroon), Togoland (modern Togo) and German East Africa (modern Rwanda, Burundi, and the mainland part of current Tanzania). Islands were acquired in the Pacific through purchases and treaties, and through a 99-year lease for the territory of Kiautschou in northeast China. But of these German colonies, only Togoland and German Samoa (after 1908) became self-sufficient and profitable; all others required subsidies from the Berlin treasury for building infrastructure, school systems, hospitals, and other institutions.

After World War I broke out, Germany participated in the war as a part of the Central Powers. At its height, Germany occupied Belgium and parts of France, and also acquired Ukraine and the Baltic States in the Treaty of Brest-Litovsk. After its defeat, the German Empire collapsed and, in the Treaty of Versailles, had to cede some of its territories and all of its overseas territories to Britain and France, as well as giving up most of its military. (Note: Articles 33 and 34) (Note: Articles 45 and 49) (Note: Section V preamble and Article 51) (Note: Articles 81 and 83) (Note: Article 88 and annex) (Note: Article 94) (Note: Article 99) (Note: Articles 100–104)

German-occupied territories during World War II in 1942. Germany (Reich) is shown in darkest green.

Germany rose again to become a great power in 1933, when Nazi Germany replaced the Weimar Republic as Germany's government. The most pressing economic matter the Nazis initially faced was the 30 percent national unemployment rate. Economist Dr. Hjalmar Schacht, President of the Reichsbank and Minister of Economics, created a scheme for deficit financing in May 1933. Capital projects were financed through the issuance of promissory notes known as Mefo bills. When the notes were presented for payment, the Reichsbank printed money. Hitler and his economic team expected that the upcoming territorial expansion would provide the means of repaying the soaring national debt. Schacht's administration achieved a rapid decline in the unemployment rate, the largest of any country during the Great Depression. Economic recovery was uneven, with reduced working hours and erratic availability of necessities, leading to disenchantment with the regime as early as 1934.

In October 1933, the Junkers Aircraft Works was expropriated. In concert with other aircraft manufacturers and under the direction of Aviation Minister Göring, production was ramped up. From a workforce of 3,200 people producing 100 units per year in 1932, the industry grew to employ a quarter of a million workers manufacturing over 10,000 technically advanced aircraft annually, less than ten years later.

An elaborate bureaucracy was created to regulate imports of raw materials and finished goods with the intention of eliminating foreign competition in the German marketplace and improving the nation's balance of payments. The Nazis encouraged the development of synthetic replacements for materials such as oil and textiles. As the market was experiencing a glut and prices for petroleum were low, in 1933, the Nazi government made a profit-sharing agreement with IG Farben, guaranteeing them a 5 percent return on capital invested in their synthetic oil plant at Leuna. Any profits in excess of that amount would be turned over to the Reich. By 1936, Farben regretted making the deal, as excess profits were by then being generated. In another attempt to secure an adequate wartime supply of petroleum, Germany intimidated Romania into signing a trade agreement in March 1939.

Major public works projects financed with deficit spending included the construction of a network of Autobahnen and providing funding for programs initiated by the previous government for housing and agricultural improvements. To stimulate the construction industry, credit was offered to private businesses, and subsidies were made available for home purchases and repairs. On the condition that the wife would leave the workforce, a loan of up to 1,000 Reichsmarks could be accessed by young couples of Aryan descent who intended to marry, and the amount that had to be repaid was reduced by 25 percent for each child born. The caveat that the woman had to remain unemployed outside the home was dropped by 1937 due to a shortage of skilled laborers.

Envisioning widespread car ownership as part of the new Germany, Hitler arranged for designer Ferdinand Porsche to draw up plans for the KdF-wagen (Strength Through Joy car), intended to be an automobile that everyone could afford. A prototype was displayed at the International Motor Show in Berlin on 17 February 1939. With the outbreak of World War II, the factory was converted to produce military vehicles. None were sold until after the war, when the vehicle was renamed the Volkswagen (people's car).

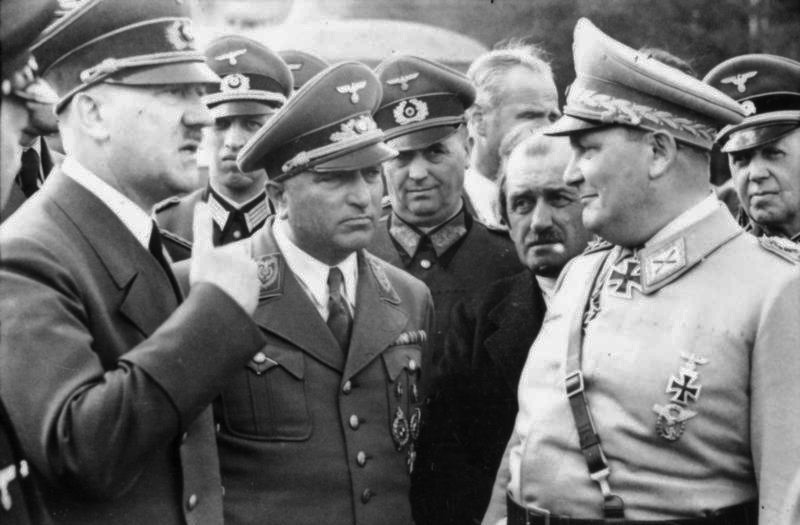
(from left) Hitler; Robert Ley, head of the German Labour Front; Ferdinand Porsche, armaments manufacturer; and Hermann Göring, head of the Four Year Plan (1942)

Six million people were unemployed when the Nazis took power in 1933, and by 1937, there were fewer than a million. This was in part due to the removal of women from the workforce. Real wages dropped by 25 percent between 1933 and 1938. After the dissolution of the trade unions in May 1933, their funds were seized and their leadership arrested, including those who attempted to co-operate with the Nazis. A new organisation, the German Labour Front, was created and placed under Nazi Party functionary Robert Ley. The average work week was 43 hours in 1933; by 1939 this increased to 47 hours.

By early 1934, the focus shifted towards rearmament. By 1935, military expenditures accounted for 73 percent of the government's purchases of goods and services. On 18 October 1936, Hitler named Göring as Plenipotentiary of the Four Year Plan, intended to speed up rearmament. In addition to calling for the rapid construction of steel mills, synthetic rubber plants, and other factories, Göring instituted wage and price controls and restricted the issuance of stock dividends. Large expenditures were made on rearmament despite growing deficits. Plans unveiled in late 1938 for massive increases to the navy and air force were impossible to fulfill, as Germany lacked the finances and material resources to build the planned units, as well as the necessary fuel required to keep them running. With the introduction of compulsory military service in 1935, the Reichswehr, which had been limited to 100,000 by the terms of the Versailles Treaty, expanded to 750,000 on active service at the start of World War II, with a million more in the reserve. By January 1939, unemployment was down to 301,800, and it dropped to only 77,500 by September.

After triumphing in economic success, the Nazis started a hostile foreign expansion policy. They first sent troops to occupy the demilitarized Rhineland in 1936, then annexed Austria and Sudetenland of Czechoslovakia in 1938. In 1939, they further annexed the Czech part of Czechoslovakia and founded the Protectorate of Bohemia and Moravia, and annexed the Lithuanian port city of Klaipėda. The Slovak part of Czechoslovakia declared independence under German support, and the Slovak Republic was established.

World War II broke out in 1939, when Germany invaded Poland with the Soviet Union. After occupying Poland, Germany started the conquest of Europe. It occupied Belgium, Luxembourg, Netherlands, Denmark, Norway, France and the British Channel Islands in 1940, Estonia, Latvia, Lithuania, Greece and Yugoslavia in 1941, Italy, Albania, Montenegro and Monaco in 1943, and Hungary in 1944. The French government continued to operate after the defeat, but was actually a client state of Germany.

Nazi Germany invaded the Soviet Union in 1941, but was forced to retreat following several Allied victories. This marks the start of the collapse of the German Reich. On 8 May 1945, Nazi Germany surrendered to the Allies, and the regime was dissolved shortly thereafter.

=== Japan (1868–1945) ===
The Empire of Japan in 1942. The empire until 1905 is in dark green, acquisitions until 1930 are in lighter green, and occupied/conceded territories are in the lightest green.

The Empire of Japan, officially the Empire of Great Japan or simply Great Japan (Dai Nippon), was an empire that existed from the Meiji Restoration on 3 January 1868 to the enactment of the post-World War II Constitution of Japan on 3 May 1947.

Imperial Japan's rapid industrialization and militarization under the slogan Fukoku kyōhei (富国強兵, "Enrich the Country, Strengthen the Armed Forces") led to its emergence as a great power, eventually culminating in its shock victory in the Russo-Japanese War, the first time an Asian country had soundly defeated a relatively modern European great power. This resulted in a further rise in nationalism in Japan and in its recognition by other nations as a rising power. After its military victories against China (First Sino-Japanese War, and the later invasion of Manchuria), the Japanese Empire was considered the preeminent power in Asia. In August 1914, former president of the United States William Howard Taft listed Japan and his country as the only two great powers uninvolved in World War I.

Its eventual membership in the Axis alliance, and the conquest of a large part of the Asia-Pacific region, allowed Japan to control much-needed resources for its further development. The empire reached its maximum extent during the Second World War, when Japan conquered many Asian and Pacific countries (see Greater East Asian Co-Prosperity Sphere). At the height of its power in 1942, the Japanese Empire ruled over a geographic area spanning 7,400,000 km^{2} (2,857,200 sq mi) to 8,508,100 km^{2} (3,285,000 sq mi). This made it the 12th or 11th largest empire in history.

After suffering many defeats and the atomic bombings of Hiroshima and Nagasaki, however, the Empire of Japan surrendered to the Allies on 2 September 1945. A period of occupation by the Allies followed the surrender, and a new constitution was created with American involvement. The constitution came into force on 3 May 1947, officially dissolving the Empire. American occupation and reconstruction of the country continued well into the 1950s, eventually forming the current nation-state whose title is simply that (formally "Nippon-koku", the State of Japan, (Note: In Japanese, the name of the country as it appears on official documents, including the country's constitution, is 日本国, meaning "State of Japan" or "Nation of Japan".) or simply Japan in English).

== Current great powers ==
=== France (1214–) ===
Flag of France

The French Republic is considered a great power. France retains its centuries-long status as a global centre of art, science and philosophy. It hosts the fourth-largest number of UNESCO World Heritage Sites and is the world's most visited tourist destination, having received over 100 million foreign visitors in 2023. France is a cultural superpower, consistently ranked among the most powerful nations in soft power, if not the most powerful of all. France is a developed country with the world's seventh-largest economy by nominal GDP and ninth-largest by PPP; in terms of aggregate household wealth, it ranks fourth in the world. France performs well in international rankings of education, health care, life expectancy, human development, and global innovation. It remains a major influence on global affairs, being one of the five permanent members of the United Nations Security Council and an official nuclear-weapon state. France is a founding and leading member of the European Union and the eurozone, as well as a key member of the North Atlantic Treaty Organization (NATO) and La Francophonie. (Note: France is the biggest contributor to the Francophonie budget, contributing more than a third of the organization's total statutory contributions. Budget quadriennal 2024-2027 de l'OIF)

Territories of France, excluding Antarctic territories. Citizens from all these territories, including the overseas administrative divisions, are French citizens, vote in national elections (presidential and legislative), and all of the inhabited territories are represented in the Senate.

France's metropolitan area extends from the Rhine to the Atlantic Ocean, and from the Mediterranean Sea to the English Channel and the North Sea; overseas territories include French Guiana in South America, Saint Pierre and Miquelon in the North Atlantic, the French West Indies, and several islands in Oceania and the Indian Ocean. It is also a transcontinental country spanning Western Europe and overseas regions and territories in the Americas and the Atlantic, Pacific and Indian Oceans. (Note: French Guiana is in South America; Guadeloupe and Martinique are in the Caribbean Sea; and Réunion and Mayotte are in the Indian Ocean, off the coast of Africa. All five are considered integral parts of the French Republic. France also comprises Saint Pierre and Miquelon in North America; Saint Barthélemy and Saint Martin in the Caribbean; French Polynesia, New Caledonia, Wallis and Futuna and Clipperton Island in the Pacific Ocean; and the French Southern and Antarctic Lands.) Including all of its territories, France has twelve time zones, the most of any country, ironically being today the only country where the sun never truly sets, a title formerly attributed to its old rival, Britain, and its empire. Due to its several coastal territories, France has the largest exclusive economic zone in the world, or the second-largest, discounting its claim to a part of Antarctica. France borders Belgium, Luxembourg, Germany, Switzerland, Monaco, Italy, Andorra and Spain in Europe, as well as the Netherlands, Suriname and Brazil in the Americas. Its eighteen integral regions (five of which are overseas) span a combined area of 643,801 km^{2} (248,573 sq mi) and over 68 million people (as of December 2024), making it the largest and second-most populous country in the European Union.

France has a developed, high-income mixed economy, characterized by sizeable government involvement, economic diversity, a skilled labor force, and high innovation. For roughly five centuries and more, the French economy has consistently ranked among the ten largest globally. France is considered an economic power, with membership in the Group of Seven, the Group of Ten, the Organisation for Economic Co-operation and Development (OECD) (headquartered in Paris), and the Group of Twenty.

France's economy is highly diversified; services represent two-thirds of both the workforce and GDP, while the industrial sector accounts for a fifth of GDP and a similar proportion of employment. France is the third-biggest manufacturing country in Europe, behind Germany and Italy, and ranks eighth in the world by share of global manufacturing output, at 1.9 percent. Less than 2 percent of GDP is generated by the primary sector, namely agriculture; however, France's agricultural sector is among the largest in value and leads the EU in overall production.

In 2018, France was the fifth-largest trading nation in the world and the second-largest in Europe, with the value of exports representing over a fifth of GDP. Its membership in the eurozone and the broader European Single Market facilitate access to capital, goods, services, and skilled labour. Despite protectionist policies over certain industries, particularly in agriculture, France has generally played a leading role in fostering free trade and commercial integration in Europe to enhance its economy. In 2019, it ranked first in Europe and 13th in the world in foreign direct investment, with European countries and the United States being leading sources. Similarly, France is ranked 6th on the FDI Confidence Index. The Paris region has the highest concentration of multinational firms in Europe.

With 24 companies that are part of the world's biggest 500 companies, France was in 2025 the second-most represented European country in the 2025 Fortune Global 500, behind Germany (30 companies) and ahead of the UK (20). In addition, some companies such as Airbus, while not listed as French, have their operational headquarters set in France. As of December 2024, France was also the country that weighed most on the eurozone's EURO STOXX 50 (representing 41.8% of total assets), ahead of Germany (26.5%), with six of the top ten companies on the list.

Several French corporations rank amongst the largest in their industries such as AXA in insurance, the world's second-largest insurance company by total nonbanking assets in 2020 and Air France in air transportation. Luxury and consumer good are particularly relevant, with L'Oreal being the world's largest cosmetic company while LVMH and Kering are the world's two largest luxury product companies. In energy and utilities, GDF-Suez and EDF are amongst the largest energy companies in the world, and Areva, now Framatome, is a large nuclear-energy company; Veolia Environnement is the world's largest environmental services and water management company; Vinci SA, Bouygues and Eiffage are large construction companies, with Vinci having the highest market capitalization of all construction companies; Michelin is the world's largest tire manufacturer by revenue since 2021; JCDecaux is the world's largest outdoor advertising corporation; BNP Paribas, Credit Agricole and Société Générale rank amongst the largest in the world by assets; Capgemini and Atos are among the largest technology consulting companies; Carrefour is the world's second-largest retail group in terms of revenue; Total is the world's fourth-largest private oil company; Danone is the world's fifth-largest food company and the world's largest supplier of mineral water; Sanofi is the world's fifth-largest pharmaceutical company; Publicis is the world's third-largest advertising company; Groupe PSA, now Stellantis, is the world's 4th and Europe's second-largest automaker; Accor is the leading European hotel group; Alstom is one of the world's leading conglomerates in rail transport.

Under the doctrine of Dirigisme, the government historically played a major role in the economy; policies such as indicative planning and nationalisation are credited for contributing to three decades of unprecedented postwar economic growth known as Trente Glorieuses. Policies aimed at promoting economic dynamism and privatisation have improved France's economic standing globally: it is among the world's 10 most innovative countries in the 2020 Bloomberg Innovation Index, and the 15th most competitive, according to the 2019 Global Competitiveness Report (up two places from 2018).

Financial services, banking, and insurance are important parts of the French economy. As of 2011, the three largest financial institutions cooperatively owned by their customers were French: Crédit Agricole, Groupe Caisse D'Epargne, and Groupe Caisse D'Epargne. According to a 2020 report and a 2024 report by S&P, France's leading banks, BNP Paribas and Crédit Agricole, are among the top world's 10 largest bank by assets, with Société Générale and Groupe BPCE ranking near the top 20 globally, and Crédit Mutuel in the top 30.

The Paris stock exchange merged with counterparts in Amsterdam and Brussels in 2000 to form Euronext, which in 2007 merged with the New York stock exchange to form NYSE Euronext, the world's largest stock exchange. Euronext Paris, the French branch of Euronext, is Europe's second-largest stock exchange market, behind the London Stock Exchange.

According to the IMF, France ranks 22nd in GDP per capita, with roughly $48,000 per inhabitant. It placed 28th in the Human Development Index, indicating very high and rising human development. Public corruption is among the lowest in the world, with France consistently ranking among the 30 least corrupt countries since the Corruption Perceptions Index began in 2012; it placed 21st in 2021, 2022 and 2023. France is Europe's second-largest spender in research and development, at over 2 percent of GDP; globally, it ranks 12th.

France is also the largest contributor to the European Space Agency, and is its de facto leader: France maintains and shares a fully-functioning space program with the European Union, the third-oldest in the world; the CNES, the French space agency, controls the Guiana Space Center, from where the ESA launches its missions. Kourou ranks among the launch centers with the highest success rates in the world, with Ariane 5 achieving a 95.5% success rate over its history.

Paris is a leading global city, has the largest GDP of any city in Europe, and is one of the largest in the world. It ranks as the first city in Europe (and 3rd worldwide) by the number of companies classified in Fortune's Fortune Global 500. Paris produced US$984 billion at market exchange rates in 2021 while the economy of the Paris metropolitan area — the largest in Europe with London — generates around $1.0 trillion. Paris has been ranked as the 2nd most attractive global city in the world in 2019 by KPMG. La Défense, Paris's Central Business District, was ranked by Ernst & Young in 2017 as the leading business district in continental Europe, and fourth in the world. The other major economic centres of the country include Lyon, Toulouse (centre of the European aerospace industry), Marseille and Lille.

France also maintains a strong military presence in the world, with one of the highest military expenditures in the world, overseas bases in Germany, Africa, and the Middle East, and troops around the world in its various overseas territories. The French military routinely conducts military operations in foreign countries, such as operation Barkhane, Chammal, and Boali, with anti-terror and stabilization operations being the most frequent. France is also at the helm of the European Union's defense program, having pushed extensively for PESCO and, more generally, for French and European independence from outside influences.

France remains the oldest-standing great power, and while its influence has waned, notably in Africa, it remains a source of soft power, a diplomatic powerhouse with a strong economy and military allowing it to exert influence in all regions of the world. Examples of this include, former French President Charles de Gaulle's buildup of relations with the PRC, as well as recent improvement of French ties with India, and the country's role in the Paris Agreement on climate change.

=== United Kingdom (1588–) ===
Flag of the United Kingdom

The United Kingdom is considered a great power. The United Kingdom is a sovereign country in north-western Europe, off the north-western coast of the European mainland. The United Kingdom includes the island of Great Britain, the north-eastern part of the island of Ireland, and many smaller islands within the British Isles. Northern Ireland shares a land border with the Republic of Ireland. Otherwise, the United Kingdom is surrounded by the Atlantic Ocean, with the North Sea to the east, the English Channel to the south, and the Celtic Sea to the south-west, giving it the 12th-longest coastline in the world. The Irish Sea separates Great Britain and Ireland. The total area of the United Kingdom is 244,376 square kilometres (94,354 sq mi), with an estimated population in 2024 of 68 million.

Map which shows the majority of the world which has English as its native language. Majority native language Co-official and majority native language Official but minority native language Secondary language: spoken as a second language by more than 20% of the population, de facto working language of government, language of instruction in education, etc.

The nearby Isle of Man, Guernsey, and Jersey are not part of the UK, being Crown Dependencies with the British Government responsible for defense and international representation. There are also 14 British Overseas Territories, the last remnants of the British Empire which, at its height in the 1920s, encompassed almost a quarter of the world's landmass and a third of the world's population, and was the largest empire in history. British influence can be observed in the language, culture and the legal and political systems of many of its former colonies; the English language is the most spoken language in the world, and is the world's lingua franca today.

The United Kingdom has the world's sixth-largest economy by nominal gross domestic product (GDP), and the tenth-largest by purchasing power parity (PPP). It has a high-income economy and a very high human development index rating, ranking 15th in the world in 2024. Today the UK remains one of the world's leading powers with considerable economic, cultural, military, scientific, technological and political influence internationally. It is a recognised nuclear state and is ranked sixth globally in military expenditure. It has been a permanent member of the United Nations Security Council since its first session in 1946.

The United Kingdom is a member of the Commonwealth of Nations, the Council of Europe, the G7, the Group of Ten, the G20, the United Nations, NATO, the Organisation for Economic Co-operation and Development (OECD), Interpol, and the World Trade Organization (WTO). It was a member state of the European Communities (EC) and its successor, the European Union (EU), from its accession in 1973 until its withdrawal in 2020 following a referendum held in 2016.

Since the end of the Second World War, the United Kingdom has been described as a "super power in decline". Nonetheless, a 2019 study in geopolitical capability (carried out by the UK-based Henry Jackson Society) found the United Kingdom to be the most powerful nation in Europe and the second most powerful in the world behind the United States. Several other studies point to the United Kingdom as one of the top ten countries country in soft power, diplomatic missions, and economy.

In the aftermath of the Second World War and the Suez Crisis, the United Kingdom's status as a world power declined substantially. Towards the end of the 20th century, and especially under the Conservative-led government of Margaret Thatcher and the Labour-led government of Tony Blair, the United Kingdom underwent a period of strong economic growth and cultural reach, especially in the United States; the relationship between the UK and the US is generally considered to be among the strongest international relationships. A notable break in this tradition occurred under the administration of Barack Obama, who sought to align with Germany as a principal European ally. President Donald Trump described the UK-US relationship as "just so important" and the administration of President Joe Biden has restored traditional relations, reiterating that "the United States has no closer ally than the United Kingdom".

The UK has been described as a "cultural superpower", and London, one of the highest-ranking global cities, has been described as a world cultural capital and the centre of European trade, at least until its withdrawal from the European Union. With 20 companies that are part of the world's biggest 500 companies, the UK was in 2025 the third-most represented European country in the Fortune Global 500 index.

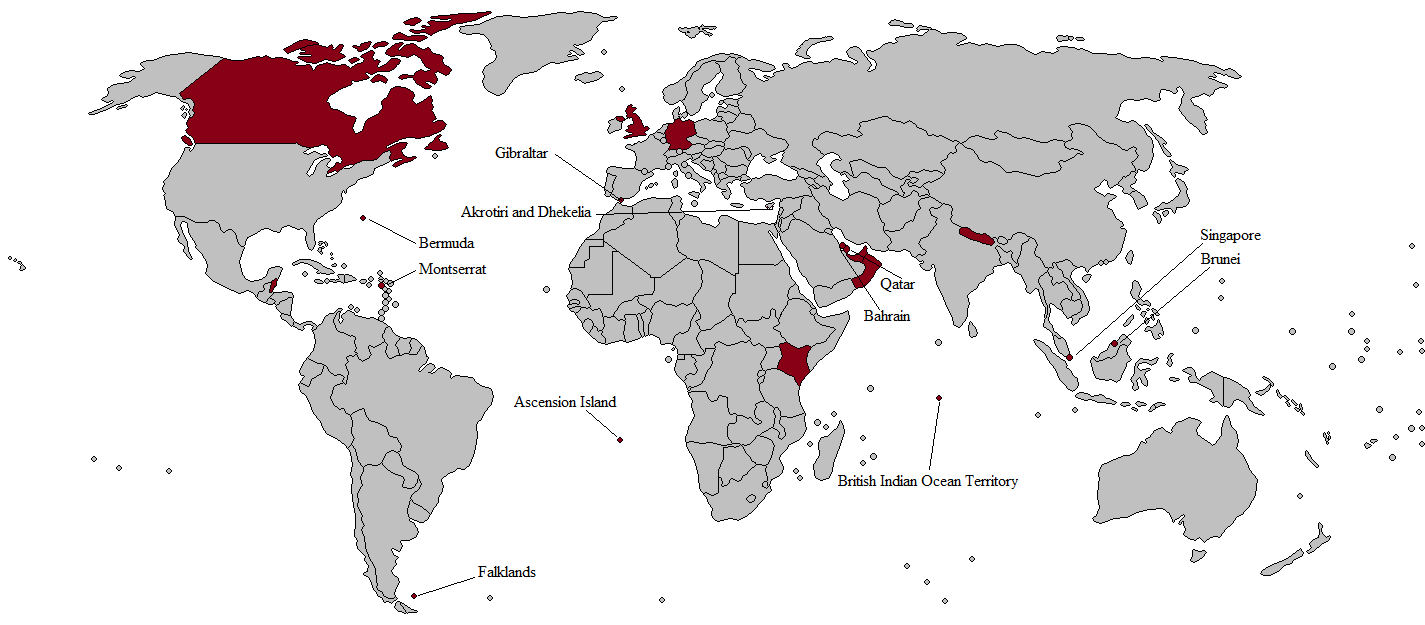
Countries with United Kingdom military bases

The UK has several military bases around the world and in the territories it controls, with the island of Diego Garcia being used for major operations during the war on terror. After leaving the European Union, the UK formed a new strategic partnership with Australia and the United States, known as AUKUS. It remains one of the driving forces of NATO, and committed significant international aid during the Russian invasion of Ukraine.

The United Kingdom, while producing less global influence, remains a relatively large and diversified economy with cultural, linguistic, diplomatic, and international influence. Taken together, these economic, military, diplomatic, and institutional capabilities support the characterization of the UK as a contemporary great power.

=== Russia (1703–) ===
Flag of Russia

Since its imperial times, Russia has risen from being a regional power to being considered a great power.

The Russian Federation, the world's largest nation by land area, is home to over 30% of the world's natural resources according to some sources. It is a high-income country and the world's fourth-largest economy in terms of PPP according to the World Bank. Throughout most of the Soviet-era, Russia was one of the world's two superpowers. However, after the dissolution of the Soviet Union, it lost its superpower status, and recently has been suggested as a potential candidate for resuming superpower status in the 21st century while others have asserted that it is already a superpower. In 2009, Hugo Chavez, late President of Venezuela whose government was noted to have enjoyed warm relations with the Kremlin, stated that "Russia is a superpower", citing waning American influence in global affairs, and suggested the ruble be elevated to a global currency. Israeli Prime Minister Benjamin Netanyahu called Russia an important superpower, praising its effectiveness as an ally of Israel.

In 2014, Stephen Kinzer of The Boston Globe compared Russia's actions with its own neighbouring territories, to those of "any other superpower", taking Ukraine and Crimea as examples. A mixed opinion has been offered by Matthew Fleischer of the Los Angeles Times: he contends that Russia will not become a superpower unless climate change eats away at the permafrost that covers, as of March 2014, two-thirds of the country's landmass. The absence of this permafrost would reveal immense stores of oil, natural gas, and precious minerals, as well as potential farmland, which would allow Russia to "become the world's bread basket—and control the planet's food supply".

Russian news agency RIA Novosti called Russia a "superpower" after its actions in Syria, and after the formation of a coalition to fight ISIS in Syria and Iraq, Benny Avni of the New York Post called Russia the "world's new sole superpower". Russian intervention in Syria was crucial in helping Bashar Al Assad to stay in power against ISIS and western-backed rebels.

Since the creation of the Wagner Group in 2014, Russia has used it to intervene in various conflicts (while maintaining plausible deniability) in Africa, aside from being involved in Libya, Syria, and even Venezuela by projecting power far away from the borders of the former Soviet Union.

However, several analysts noted that Russia showed signs of an aging, shrinking population. Fred Weir said that this severely constricts and limits Russia's potential to re-emerge as a central world power. In 2011, British historian and professor Niall Ferguson also highlighted the negative effects of Russia's declining population, and suggested that Russia is on its way to "global irrelevance". Russia has, however, shown a slight population growth since the late 2000s, partly due to immigration and slowly rising birth rates.

Nathan Smith of the National Business Review has said that, despite Russia's potential, it did not win the new "Cold War" in the 1980s; thus superpower status is inaccurate. Dmitry Medvedev predicted that if the Russian elite is not consolidated, Russia will disappear as a single state. Vladimir Putin said the moment the Caucasus leaves Russia, other territorial regions would follow.

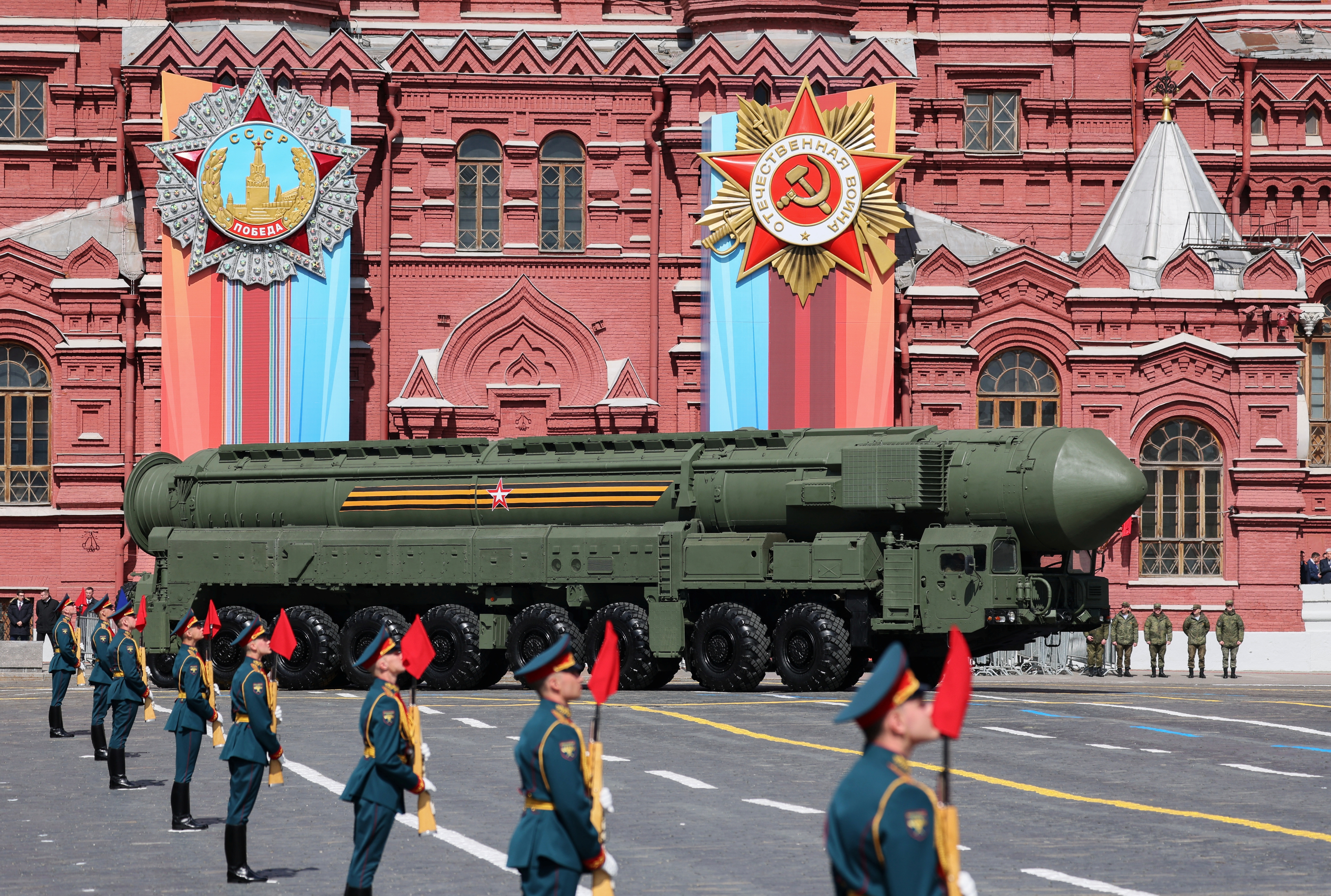
A Russian ICBM in Red Square during the Moscow Victory Day Parade, 2023.

After Russia's poor performance in the 2022 Russian invasion of Ukraine, some analysts questioned Russia's military and power projection capabilities. After two years of war, the Russian army did make progress in Ukraine, but the country's economy and resources have been strained. Russia's ally Syria was overrun by rebels; Bashar al-Assad was granted asylum in Russia. Nevertheless, Russia maintains the world's largest nuclear arsenal, a large military force, and can project influence around the world.

=== United States (1848–) ===
NATO members and their partners (NATO is a military alliance which the United States is part of.) NATO members Membership Action Plan Enhanced Opportunities Partners Individual Partnership Action Plan Partnership for Peace Mediterranean Dialogue Istanbul Cooperation Initiative Global Partners

The United States was the foremost of the world's two superpowers during the Cold War. After the Cold War, the most common belief was that only the United States fulfilled the criteria to be considered a superpower. Regardless of the debate on its status as a superpower, the United States is considered a great power.

Its geographic area composes the third or fourth-largest state in the world, with an area of approximately 9.37 million km^{2}. The population of the US was 334.9 million in 2024, the third-largest of any nation. The US holds a permanent seat on the United Nations Security Council, with two allies with permanent seats, the United Kingdom (Note: See Special Relationship.) and France. The US has strong ties with most of Europe and NATO, Latin America, Australia, New Zealand, South Africa, Israel, Commonwealth Realms in Oceania and the Caribbean, and several East Asian countries (South Korea, Taiwan, Japan, Singapore).

The economic strength of the United States is a major driver of its power. The United States is a highly developed country, and its economy accounts for more than a quarter of global GDP, the world's largest by country. By value, the United States is the world's largest importer and second-largest exporter. Although it accounts for just over 4.2% of the world's total population, the U.S. holds over 30% of the total wealth in the world, the largest share held by any country. The US has abundant mineral, energy, and metal resources, as well as timber, a large and modernized farming industry, and a large industrial base. The United States dollar is the dominant world reserve currency. US systems were rooted in capitalist economic theory based on supply and demand, in which production was determined by customer demand. America was allied with the G7 major economies. US economic policy prescriptions were the "standard" reform packages promoted for crisis-wracked developing countries by Washington, DC–based international institutions such as the International Monetary Fund (IMF), World Bank, as well as the US Treasury Department.

Countries with United States military bases, as of 2026

The military of the United States is a naval-based advanced military with by far the highest military expenditure in the world. The United States Navy is the world's largest navy, with the largest number of aircraft carriers, and military bases all over the world. The US had the largest nuclear arsenal in the world during the first half of the Cold War and still maintains the second-largest; it also has one of the largest armies and the largest air force in the world. Under the NATO nuclear sharing program, the United States provides nuclear weapons to protect several NATO states. The US also possesses a powerful global intelligence network in the Central Intelligence Agency.

The cultural impact of the US, often known as Americanization, is evident in the influence of US music, TV, films, art, and fashion on other countries, as well as in the desire for freedom of speech and other guaranteed rights that its residents enjoy. Various styles of music born in the US have become globally influential.

Following the conclusion of the Cold War, the US enjoyed a short period of absolute dominance, stretching from 1993 to 2001. The subsequent war on terrorism, second invasion of Iraq, the response to the Great Recession and the COVID-19 pandemic in the United States were all seen to damage the credibility of the United States.

The United States intervenes and can hold a military presence in several countries, notably Afghanistan, Somalia, and Iraq. The US is able to strike around the world, as it proved during anti-terror operations like the killing of Osama Bin Laden, or the assassination of Qasem Soleimani.

In 2011, the U.S. had 10 major strengths, according to Chinese scholar Peng Yuan, the director of the Institute of American Studies of the China Institutes for Contemporary International Studies. He noted that the United States has a sizable population (300 million), enjoys its position as a two-ocean power, and has abundant natural resources. Besides, he believed that the United States' military muscle, high technology, fair education system, cultural power, cyber power, allies (as the United States has more allies than any other state), global force projection, intelligence capabilities (as demonstrated by the killing of Osama bin Laden), intellectual think tanks and research institutes, and strategic power lead the United States into the superpower status it now enjoys. However, he noted that the recent breakdown of bipartisanship in the US, economic slowdown, intractable deficits and rising debt, societal polarization, and the weakening of US institutional power since the US can no longer dominate global institutions, are the current flaws of the United States' power.

Political scientists and geopolitical analysts cite five primary structural factors underpinning the United States' global position: its economy, military superiority, diplomatic influence, technological innovation, and cultural reach.

=== Italy (1871–) ===
The Italian Republic has been referred to as a great power with almost the same power as Germany, France, and the UK.

Italy's great power strengths include a vast advanced economy, the second-strongest manufacturing industry in Europe, a large luxury goods market, a large national budget and the third largest gold reserve in the world. It has one of the largest SDRs and voting power in the IMF. The country is a cultural superpower and it has close ties with the rest of the Catholic world as the home of the Pope. Italy is a key player in maintaining international security, especially in the wider Mediterranean region, (Note: The concept of Mediterraneo Allargato (Enlarged Mediterranean) includes the Horn of Africa, the Balkans and the MENA region.) by performing air policing duties for its allies and commanding multinational forces in foreign countries. The country has therefore developed considerable military capabilities by building two aircraft carriers and establishing some overseas military bases. The country is home to two nuclear bases and, as part of the NATO nuclear sharing program, therefore has a retaliatory nuclear capacity despite nominally being a non-nuclear state. According to the former Italian president Francesco Cossiga, Italy's plans of nuclear retaliation during the Cold War consisted of targeting nuclear weapons in Czechoslovakia and Hungary in case the Soviet Union waged nuclear war against NATO. He acknowledged the presence of U.S. nuclear weapons in Italy, and speculated about the possible presence of British and French nuclear weapons. Italy secretly developed its own nuclear weapons program, and one in collaboration with France and Germany, but abandoned such projects when it joined the nuclear sharing program. The country has developed the ABM PAAMS system. It has developed several space-launch vehicles, such as Alfa and more recently Vega. In more recent years, under the auspices of the European Space Agency, it has demonstrated the reentry and landing of a spacecraft, the Intermediate eXperimental Vehicle. Italy is home to one of two ground operations centers of the Galileo global satellite navigation system.

Besides, Italy has one of the most advanced economies in the world as the eighth-largest economy by nominal GDP (third in the European Union), the sixth-largest national wealth, and the third-largest central bank gold reserve. It ranks very high in life expectancy, quality of life, healthcare, and education. The country is considered a great power and it plays a prominent role in regional and global economic, military, cultural, and diplomatic affairs. Italy is a founding and leading member of the European Union and a member of numerous international institutions, including the United Nations, NATO, the OECD, the Organization for Security and Co-operation in Europe, the World Trade Organization, the Group of Seven, the G20, the Union for the Mediterranean, the Latin Union, the Council of Europe, Uniting for Consensus, and many more. The source of many inventions and discoveries, the country has long been a global centre of art, music, literature, philosophy, science and technology, and fashion, and has greatly influenced and contributed to diverse fields including cinema, cuisine, sports, jurisprudence, banking, and business. As a reflection of its cultural wealth, Italy has the world's largest number of World Heritage Sites (58), and is the fourth-most visited country in the world.

Moreover, Italy contributes significantly to scientific research; in 2023, it was the sixth-largest producer of scientific articles. Italy operates some permanent research stations in Antarctica. In terms of spaceflight capability, the country owns the Broglio Space Centre. The country is a major contributor to the European Space Agency and the International Space Station.

However, due to internal political instability, a large public debt, a diminishing economic productivity, low economic growth in the last fifteen years and a significant Centre-North/South socio-economic divide, Italy is often considered as the least of the great powers.

=== Japan (1952–) ===
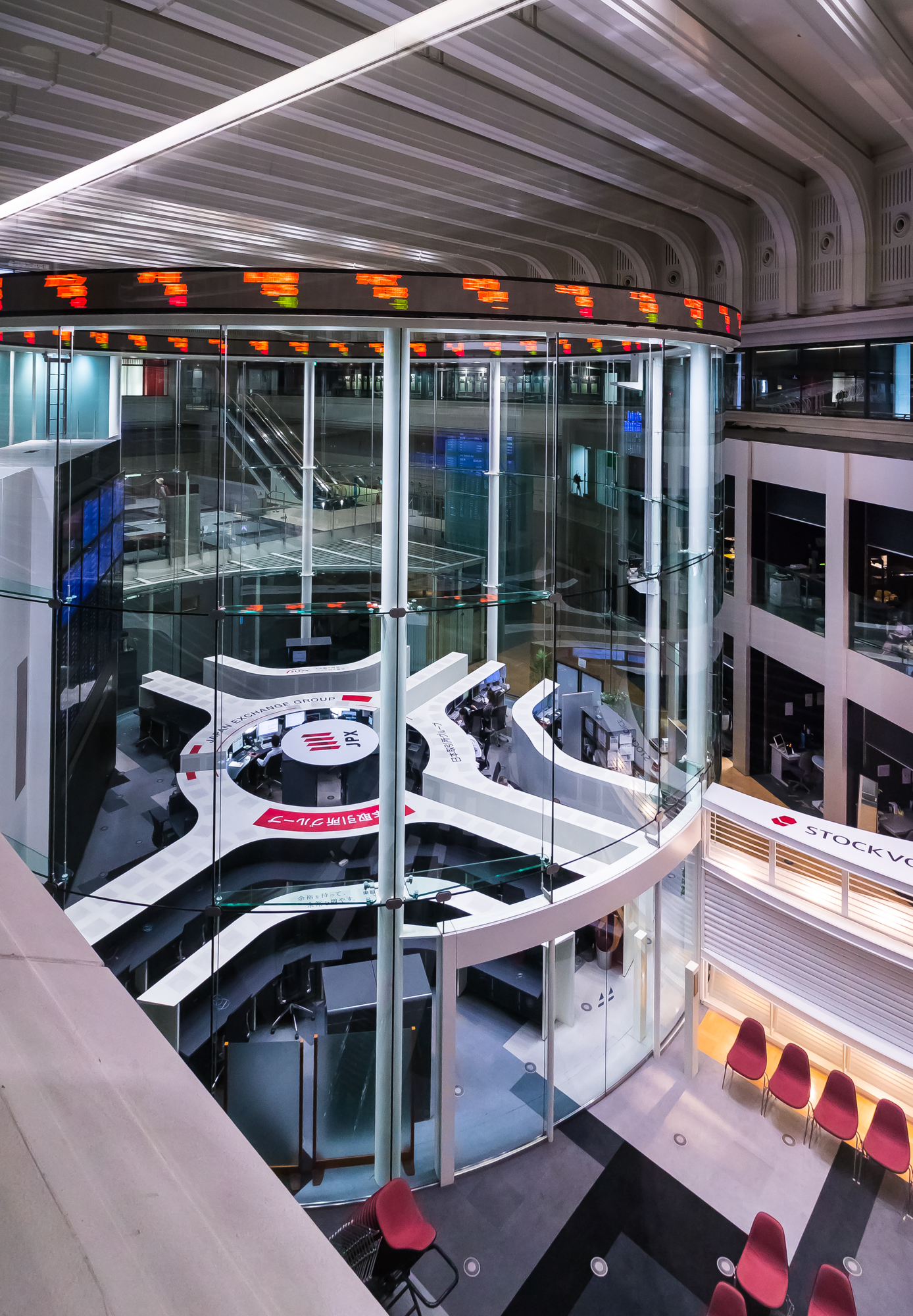
Tokyo Stock Exchange, the third largest stock exchange in the world by market capitalization, as well as the 2nd largest stock market in Asia

Japan is considered a great power. It is a member of numerous international organizations, including the United Nations (since 1956), the OECD, and the Group of Seven. Although it has renounced its right to declare war, the country maintains Self-Defense Forces that ranks among the world's strongest militaries. After World War II, Japan experienced record growth during the economic miracle, becoming the second-largest economy in the world by 1990. The Japanese economy was the world's second-largest economy in terms of GDP until it was surpassed by China in 2010, then by Germany in 2023. As of 2024, the country's economy is the fourth-largest by nominal GDP as well as the fifth-largest by PPP. The country is the third-largest in the world by total wealth. It is also ranked "very high" on the Human Development Index.

Japan's capital, Tokyo, is a leading Alpha + Global city, with the Greater Tokyo Area having the second-largest metropolitan economy in the world and a gross metropolitan product estimated at US$2 trillion. The city is also one of the world's major financial centres, being the headquarters of many of the world’s largest investment banks and insurance companies. It is also the hub for the country’s telecommunications, electronic, broadcasting, and publishing industries. The other major economic centres of the country include Osaka, Yokohama and Nagoya.

In the 1980s, many political and economic analysts predicted that Japan would eventually accede to superpower status, due to its large population, huge gross domestic product, and high economic growth at that time. Japan was expected to eventually surpass the economy of the United States, which never happened. However, Japan is considered a cultural superpower in terms of the large-scale influence Japanese food, music, video games, manga, anime and movies have on the world. In 2023, U.S. News & World Report ranked Japan as the most culturally influential country in Asia and 5th in the world. Similarly, in 2019 Japan was considered the 8th most powerful country in terms of soft power.

Japan is also considered to be a technological power, being the leader in the automotive, electronics and robotics industries. As of 2022, 40 of the Fortune Global 500 companies are based in Japan. Japan's most valuable and internationally known brands include: Toyota, Honda, Sony, SoftBank, Subaru, Nissan, Mazda, Canon Inc., Uniqlo and Nintendo.

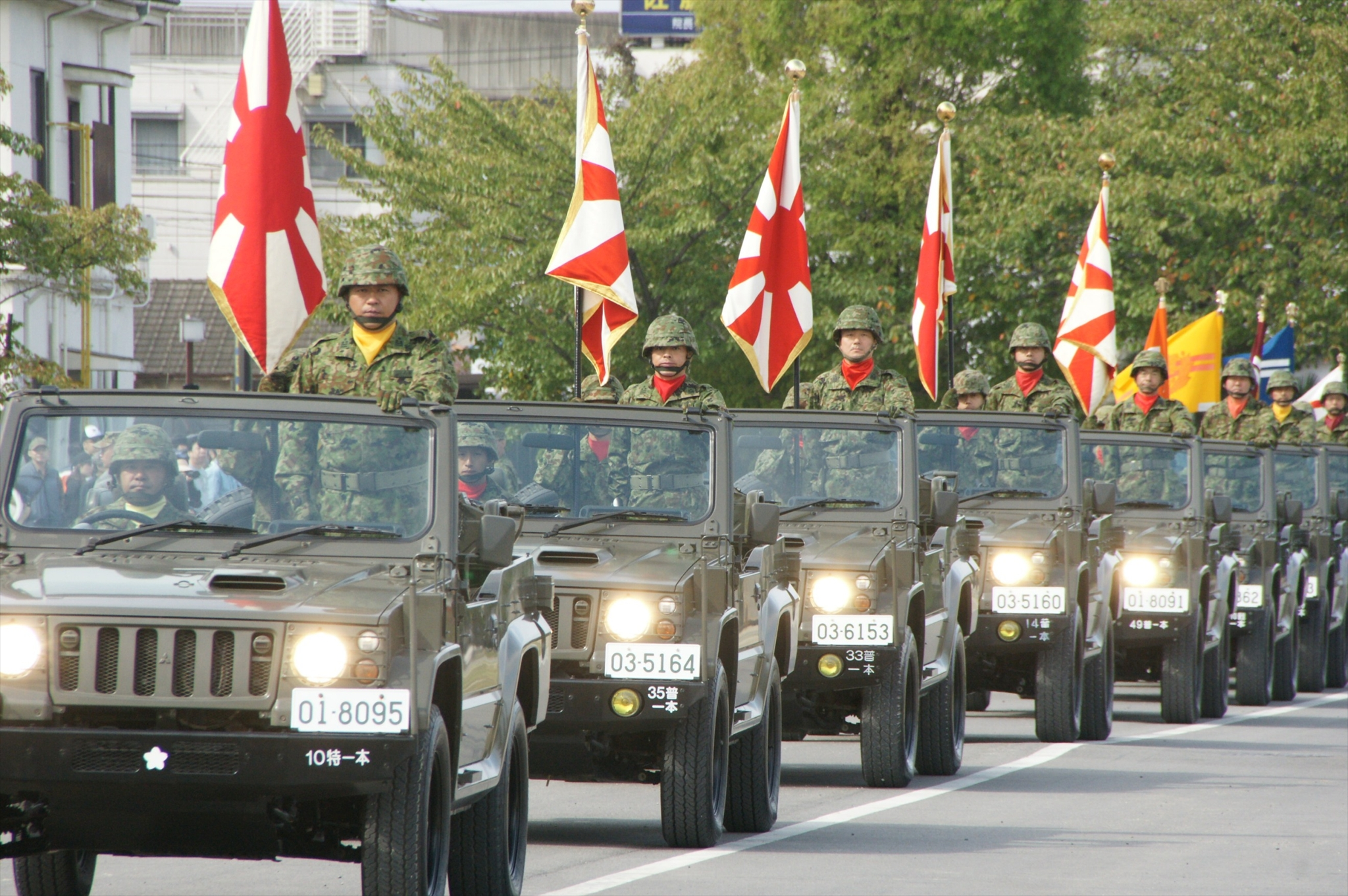
Head of the 10th Division and other regiments on JSDF Day in 2011

Japan was ranked the world's fourth most powerful military in 2015. The military capabilities of the Japan Self-Defense Forces are held back by the pacifist 1947 constitution. However, there is a gradual push for a constitutional amendment. On 18 September 2015, the National Diet enacted the Legislation for Peace and Security, a series of laws that allow Japan's Self-Defense Forces to collective self-defense of allies in combat in certain conditions for the first time under its constitution. In May 2017, former Japanese prime minister Shinzo Abe set a 2020 deadline for revising Article 9, which would legitimize the JSDF in the Constitution. However, Article 9 has not yet been revised as of 2025, and Japan's military forces are still only meant for its own defense.

Japan is not the military giant it once was, and its new constitution restrains its power projection to having a single overseas military base, in Djibouti. However, its considerable economical strength, alliances, technology and cultural influence still make it a great power.

=== China (1971–) ===
Countries which signed cooperation documents related to the Belt and Road Initiative, which is a global infrastructure development strategy adopted by the Chinese government in 2013 to invest in nearly 150 countries and international organizations

China started to be seen as a great power after World War II as one of the Four Policemen and principal Allies of World War II. After its victory in the Chinese Civil War, the Korean War in 1950–1953 and the Sino-Soviet split in the 1960s, the People's Republic of China emerged as one of the main players in international geopolitics during the late Cold War, with its status as a recognized nuclear weapons state in the 1960s. The People's Republic was officially recognized as the sole legitimate government of China to the United Nations, and as such one of the permanent members of the UN Security Council, in 1971. After the motion passed, China was gradually recognized as a great power.

Currently, China has the world's second-largest population, second-largest GDP per country, and the largest economy in the world by PPP since 2013 according to The Economist. China created the Belt and Road Initiative, which according to analysts has been a geostrategic effort to take a more significant role in global affairs and challenge US post-war hegemony. It has also been argued that China co-founded the Asian Infrastructure Investment Bank and New Development Bank to compete with the World Bank and the International Monetary Fund in development finance. In 2015, China launched the Made in China 2025 strategic plan to develop its manufacturing sector further. There have been debates on the effectiveness and practicality of these programs in promoting China's global status.

On a foreign exchange rate basis, some estimates in 2020 and early 2021 said that China could overtake the U.S. in 2028, or 2026 if the Chinese currency further strengthened. As of July 2021, Bloomberg L.P. analysts estimated that China may either overtake the U.S. to become the world's biggest economy in the 2030s or never be able to reach such a goal.

The nation receives continual coverage in the popular press of its emerging superpower status, and has been identified as a rising or emerging economic growth and military superpower by academics and other experts. The "rise of China" has been named the top news story of the 21st century by the Global Language Monitor, as measured by its appearances in global print and electronic media, on the Internet and in the blogosphere, and on social media. The term "Second Superpower" has been applied by scholars to the possibility that the People's Republic of China could emerge with global power and influence on par with the United States. The potential for the two countries to form stronger relations to address global issues is sometimes referred to as the Group of Two.

Barry Buzan asserted in 2004 that "China certainly presents the most promising all-round profile" of a potential superpower. Buzan claimed that "China is currently the most fashionable potential superpower and the one whose degree of alienation from the dominant international society makes it the most obvious political challenger." However, he noted this challenge is constrained by the major challenges of development and by the fact that its rise could trigger a counter-coalition of states in Asia.

Parag Khanna stated in 2008 that by making massive trade and investment deals with Latin America and Africa, China had established its presence as a superpower along with the European Union and the United States. China's rise is demonstrated by its rising share of trade in its gross domestic product. He believed that China's "consultative style" had enabled it to develop political and economic ties with many countries, including those the United States viewed as rogue states. He stated that the Shanghai Cooperation Organisation founded with Russia and the Central Asian countries may eventually be the "NATO of the East".

Historian Timothy Garton Ash argued in 2011 that the International Monetary Fund predicted that China's GDP (purchasing power parity adjusted) would overtake that of the United States in 2016 – which it did in 2013 – and that a power shift to a world with several superpowers was happening in the early 21st century. However, China still lacks soft power and power-projection capabilities and has a low GDP per capita. The article also stated that the Pew Research Center, in a 2009 survey, found that people in 15 of 22 countries believed that China had already overtaken or would overtake the US as the world's leading superpower.

In an interview given in 2011, Singapore's first premier, Lee Kuan Yew, stated that while China supplanting the United States is not a foregone conclusion, Chinese leaders are nonetheless serious about displacing the United States as the most powerful country in Asia. "They have transformed a poor society by an economic miracle to become now the second-largest economy in the world. How could they not aspire to be number 1 in Asia, and in time the world?" The Chinese strategy, Lee maintains, will revolve around their "huge and increasingly highly skilled and educated workers to out-sell and out-build all others". Nevertheless, relations with the United States, at least in the medium term, will not take a turn for the worse because China will "avoid any action that will sour up relations with the U.S. To challenge a stronger and technologically superior power like the U.S. will abort their 'peaceful rise.'" Though Lee believes China is genuinely interested in growing within the global framework the United States has created, it is biding its time until it becomes strong enough to successfully redefine the prevailing political and economic order.

China is thought to be on the course to becoming the world's largest economy and is making rapid progress in many areas. The United States is seen as a declining superpower, as indicated by factors such as a weak economic recovery, financial instability, large deficits, increasing political polarization, and overregulation that forces jobs overseas to China. However, after the COVID-19 pandemic, China's economic growth has greatly stalled; while the country is still progressing, its rapid rise has been considerably slowed.

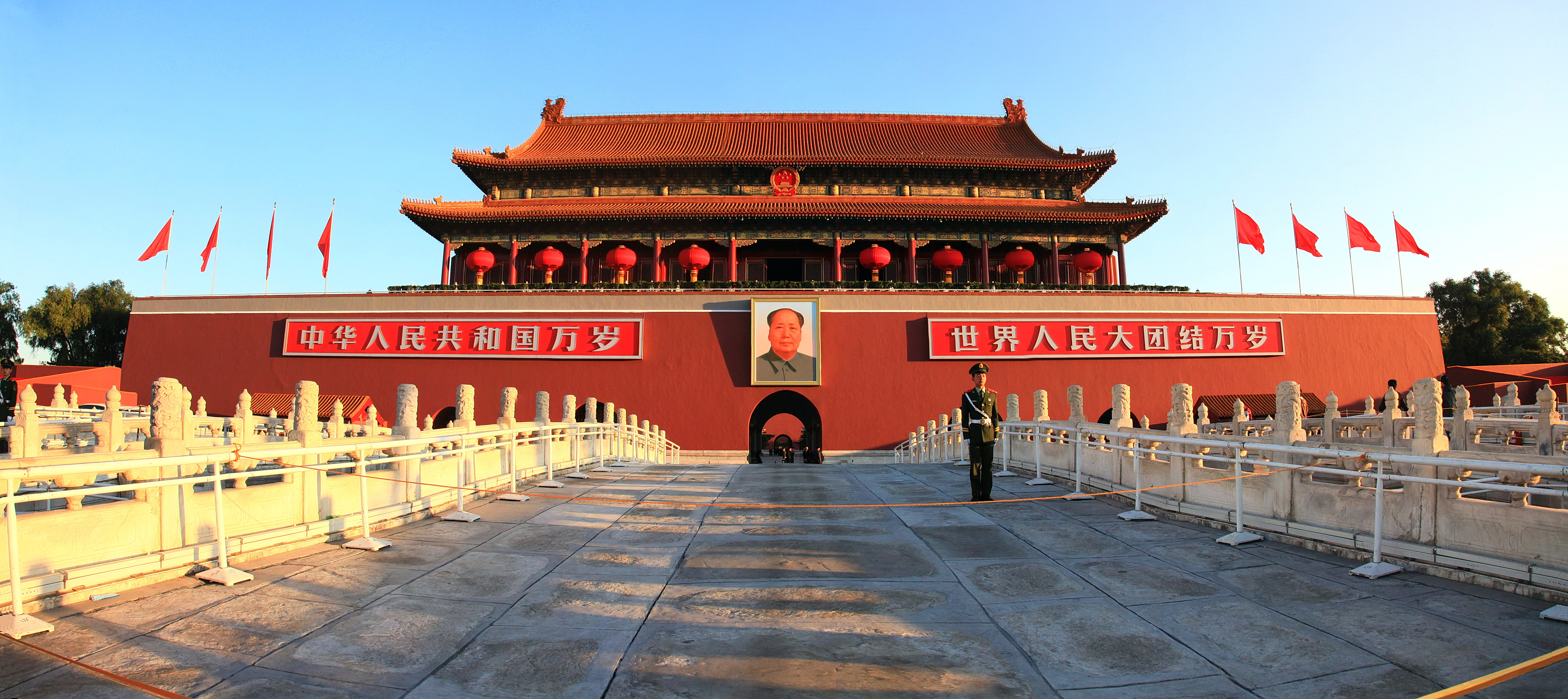
Tiananmen, the "Gate of Heavenly Peace", is the front gate of the Imperial City of Beijing, first built under the Yongle Emperor who also commissioned the Yongle Encyclopedia and the Ming treasure voyages. As a national symbol of China, Tiananmen features a giant portrait of Chairman Mao Zedong with two giant placards: the left one reads "Long Live the People's Republic of China" (中华人民共和国万岁; Zhōnghuá Rénmín Gònghéguó wànsuì), while the right one reads "Long Live the Great Unity of the World's Peoples" (世界人民大团结万岁; Shìjiè rénmín dà tuánjié wànsuì).

Some consensus holds that China has met the criteria for superpower status, citing its growing political clout and leadership in certain economic sectors. Although China's military projection is still premature and untested, the perceived humiliation of US leadership in failing to prevent its closest allies from joining the Asian Infrastructure Investment Bank, along with the Belt and Road Initiative and China's role in the worldwide groundings of the Boeing 737 MAX, was seen as a paradigm shift or an inflection point to the unipolar world order that dominated post-Cold War international relations. University Professor Øystein Tunsjø argues that competition between China and the USA will intensify, narrowing the gap between them, while the gap between the two countries and the rest of the top ten largest economies will widen. Additionally, economics correspondent, Peter S. Goodman and Beijing Bureau Chief of China, Jane Perlez further stated that China is using a combination of its economic might and growing military advancements to pressure, coerce and change the current world order to accommodate China's interests at the expense of the United States and its allies.

Diplomatically, China has seen some success in Africa, becoming the largest trading partner of the continent, and has made some overtures towards Europe. However, the country's authoritarian rule and controversies such as with the Uyghurs have soured relations with the major European powers.

The 2019 Chinese Defense White Paper highlights the growing strategic competition between China and the United States. According to Anthony H. Cordesman, although the paper flags both China and the US as competing superpowers, it was far more moderate in its treatment of the US than the United States' view of Chinese military developments. Cordesman states that the paper was a warning that will shape Sino-American relations as China becomes stronger than Russia in virtually every other aspect, except its nuclear arsenal.

On 19 August 2019, the United States Studies Centre published a report, suggesting that Washington no longer enjoys primacy in the Indo-Pacific. It stresses that the war on terror has greatly distracted the US response to China's role in the Pacific; that US military force in the region has greatly atrophied whereas Beijing only grew stronger and more capable since the September 11 attacks, to the point that China could now actively challenge the United States over the Indo-Pacific. China's challenging the United States for global predominance constitutes the core issue in the debate over the American decline.

China's emergence as a global economic power is tied to its large working population. However, the population in China is aging faster than almost any other country in history. Current demographic trends could hinder economic growth, create challenging social problems, and limit China's capabilities to act as a new global hegemon. China's primarily debt-driven economic growth also creates concerns for substantial credit default risks and a potential financial crisis.

=== Germany (1991–) ===
The Federal Republic of Germany is, since its reunification, considered a great power.

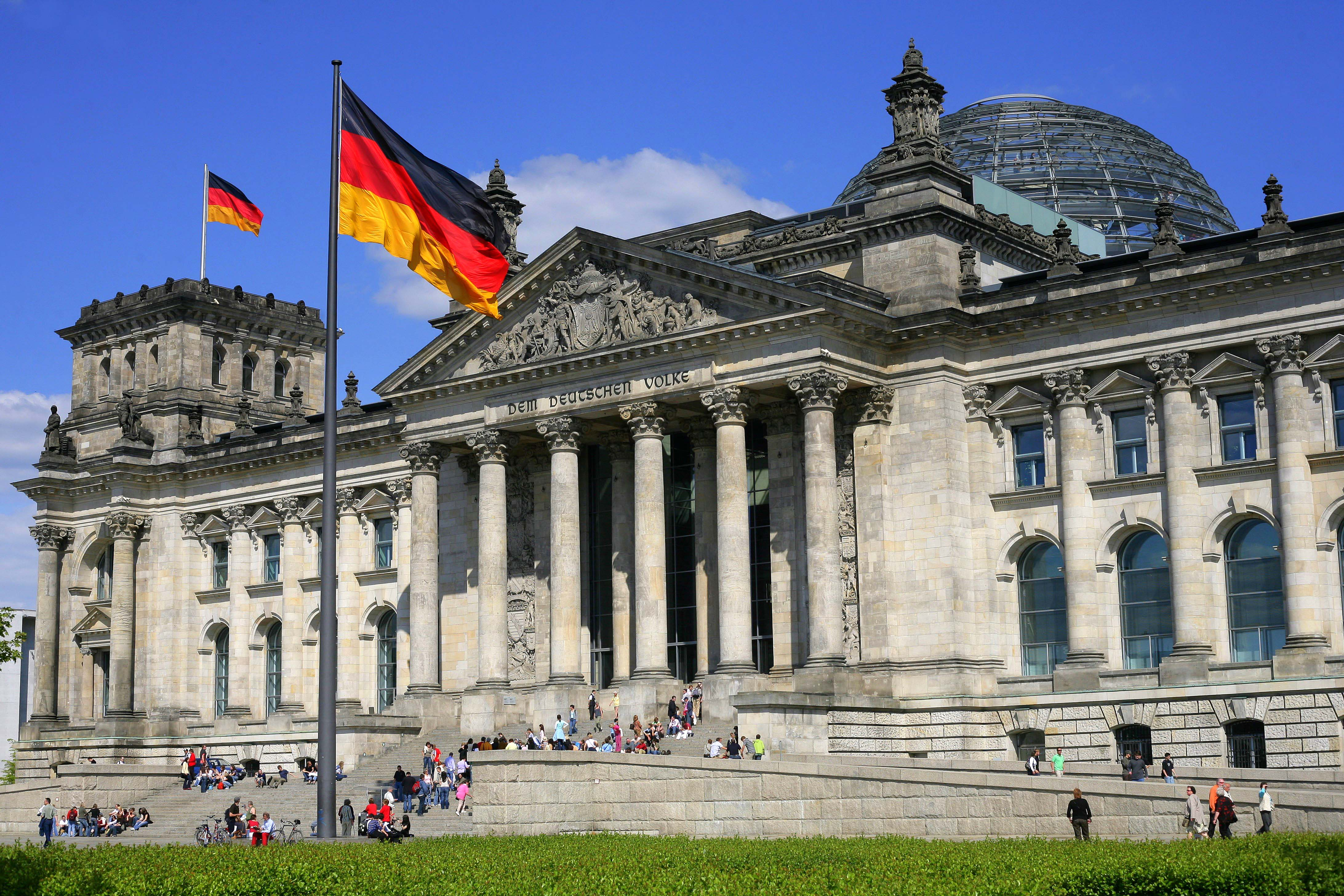
The Reichstag building in Berlin is the site of the German parliament.

Germany has a strong economy; it has the largest economy in Europe, the world's third-largest economy by nominal GDP, and the sixth-largest by PPP. It is one of the most innovative countries in several industrial, scientific and technological sectors, and is both the world's third-largest exporter and importer. As a developed country, which ranks very high on the Human Development Index, it offers social security, a universal health care system, and a tuition-free university education. Germany is a member of the United Nations, NATO, the G7, the G20, and the OECD. It has the third-greatest number of UNESCO World Heritage Sites.

Germany's social market economy has a highly skilled labour force, a low level of corruption, and a high level of innovation. Its GDP per capita measured in purchasing power standards amounts to 121% of the EU27 average (100%). The service sector contributes approximately 69% of the total GDP, industry 31%, and agriculture 1% as of 2017. Its unemployment rate, published by Eurostat, amounts to 3.2% as of January 2020, which is the fourth-lowest in the EU.

Germany is part of the European single market. In 2017, the country accounted for 28% of the eurozone economy according to the International Monetary Fund. Its monetary policy is set by the European Central Bank, which is headquartered in Frankfurt. Frankfurt is also home to the Frankfurt Stock Exchange, the 12th largest stock exchange by market capitalization and one of the biggest in Europe. The automotive industry in Germany is regarded as one of the most competitive and innovative in the world, and is the sixth-largest by production.

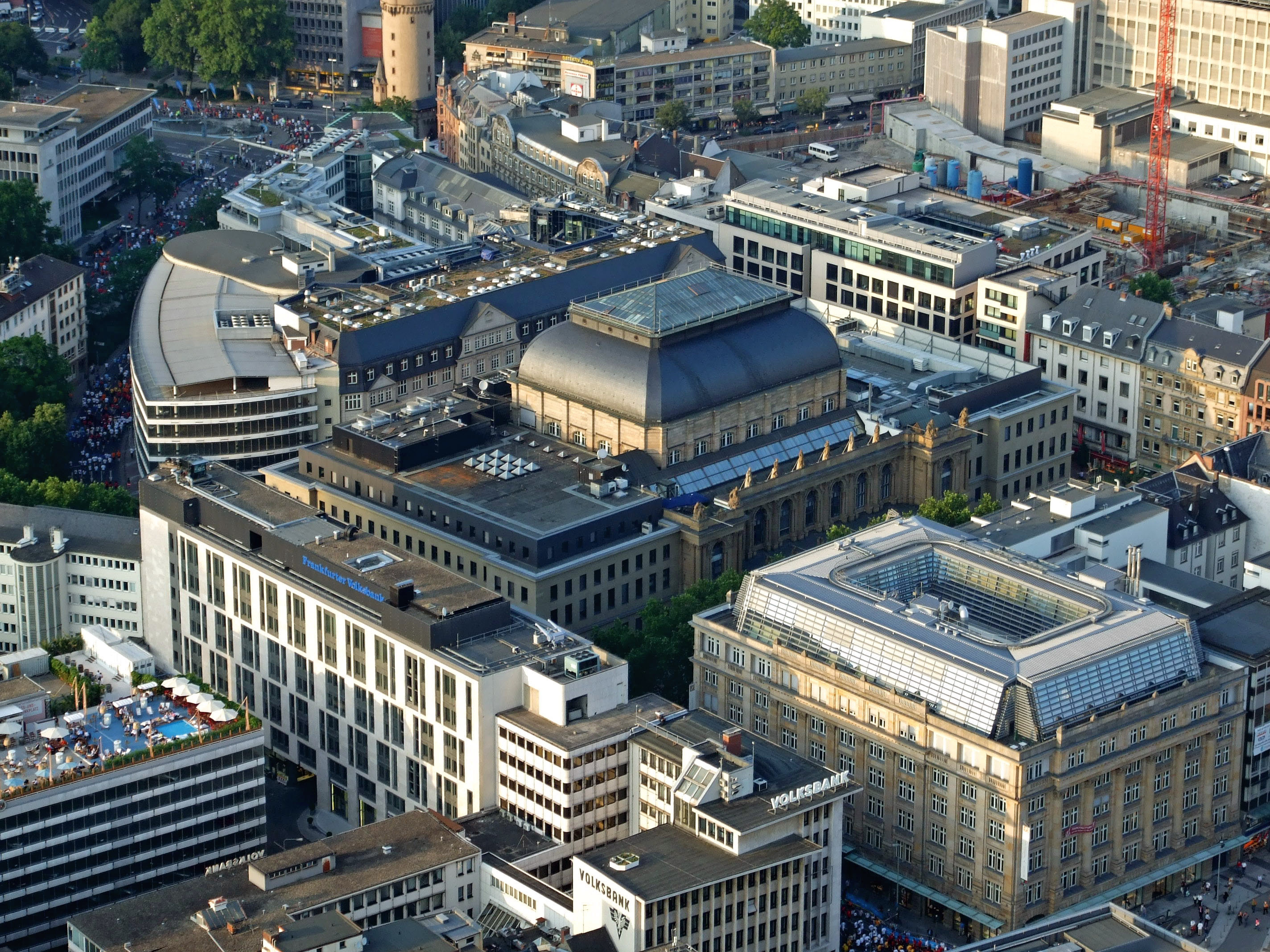
Building in the center of Frankfurt

Of the world's 500 largest stock-market-listed companies measured by revenue in 2025, the Fortune Global 500, 30 are headquartered in Germany, the most of any European country. Well-known international brands include Mercedes-Benz, BMW, Volkswagen, Audi, Siemens, Allianz, Adidas, Porsche, Bosch and Deutsche Telekom. Berlin is a hub for startup companies and has become the leading location for venture capital funded firms in the European Union. Germany is recognised for its large portion of specialised small and medium enterprises, known as the Mittelstand model. These companies represent 48% global market leaders in their segments, labelled hidden champions.

Research and development efforts form an integral part of the German economy. In 2018 Germany ranked fourth globally in terms of number of science and engineering research papers published. Germany was ranked 9th in the Global Innovation Index in 2019 and 2020. Research institutions in Germany include the Max Planck Society, the Helmholtz Association, and the Fraunhofer Society and the Leibniz Association. Germany is the largest contributor to the European Space Agency. While its diplomatic power is limited compared to that of Britain and France, Germany still leads the European Union with France, formulating various European sanctions, yet remained dependent on Russian gas for a time. Germany has foreign relations with almost every country.

While recent years have seen German overtures towards Russia labeled a mistake, and the German economy has been struggling, having the lowest GDP growth among the G7 during recent years, Germany remains one of the largest and most advanced economies, with a strong, slowly recovering military, and is still considered a great power.

== Emerging great powers ==
Some nations, while not fitting the criteria to be considered or recognized as a great power yet, are emerging, with a fast-growing economy, as major driving forces in the modern world. Examples of such powers include India, Egypt, Turkey and Brazil.

== See also ==
- Cold War 1947–1989
- Concert of Europe, after 1814
- Diplomatic history of World War I
- Diplomatic history of World War II
- European balance of power
- Foreign policy of the Russian Empire
- Historiography of the British Empire
  - History of the foreign relations of the United Kingdom
  - Pax Britannica
  - Timeline of British diplomatic history
- History of foreign relations of China
- History of colonialism
- History of French foreign relations
  - French colonial empire
- History of German foreign policy
- History of globalization
- History of Japanese foreign relations
- History of the foreign policy of the United States
- International relations (1648–1814)
- International relations (1919–1939)
- International relations (1814–1919)
- List of ancient great powers
- List of largest empires
- List of medieval great powers
- Middle power
- New Imperialism
- Potential superpower
- Power (international relations)
- Timeline of European imperialism

== Bibliography ==
- Anderson, Fred (2007). Crucible of War: The Seven Years' War and the Fate of Empire in British North America, 1754–1766. Vintage – Random House. ISBN 978-0-307-42539-3.
- DeLong, J. Bradford (February 1997). "Slouching Towards Utopia?: The Economic History of the Twentieth Century. XV. Nazis and Soviets". econ161.berkeley.edu. University of California at Berkeley. Archived from the original on 11 May 2008.
- Evans, Richard J. (2005). The Third Reich in Power. New York: Penguin. ISBN 978-0-14-303790-3.
- Ferguson, Niall (2004). Empire: The Rise and Demise of the British World Order and the Lessons for Global Power. Basic Books. ISBN 978-0-465-02329-5.
- Ingrao, Charles & Szabo, Franz A.J., eds. (2007). The Germans and the East. Purdue University Press. ISBN 978-1-55753-443-9.
- Kershaw, Ian (2008). Hitler: A Biography. New York: W. W. Norton & Company. ISBN 978-0-393-06757-6.
- Lloyd, Trevor Owen (1996). The British Empire 1558–1995. Oxford University Press. ISBN 978-0-19-873134-4.
- Marston, Daniel (2002). The French and Indian War. Essential Histories. Osprey. ISBN 1-84176-456-6.
- McNab, Chris (2009). The Third Reich. London: Amber Books. ISBN 978-1-906626-51-8.
- Reinach, Joseph (1920). "Le rôle de l'impératrice Eugénie en septembre et octobre 1870". Revue d'Histoire du XIXe siècle – 1848 (in French). 17 (85). Société d'Histoire de la Révolution de 1848: 193. doi:10.3406/r1848.1920.1652.
- Richter, Daniel (2011). Before the Revolution: America's ancient pasts. Harvard University Press. ISBN 978-0-674-05580-3.
- Shirer, William L. (1960). The Rise and Fall of the Third Reich. New York: Simon & Schuster.
- Truitt, Wesley B. (2010). Power and Policy: Lessons for Leaders in Government and Business. Praeger. ISBN 978-0-313-38240-6.
- Tooze, Adam (2006). The Wages of Destruction: The Making and Breaking of the Nazi Economy. New York; Toronto: Viking. ISBN 978-0-670-03826-8.
