= List of Italian inventions and discoveries =

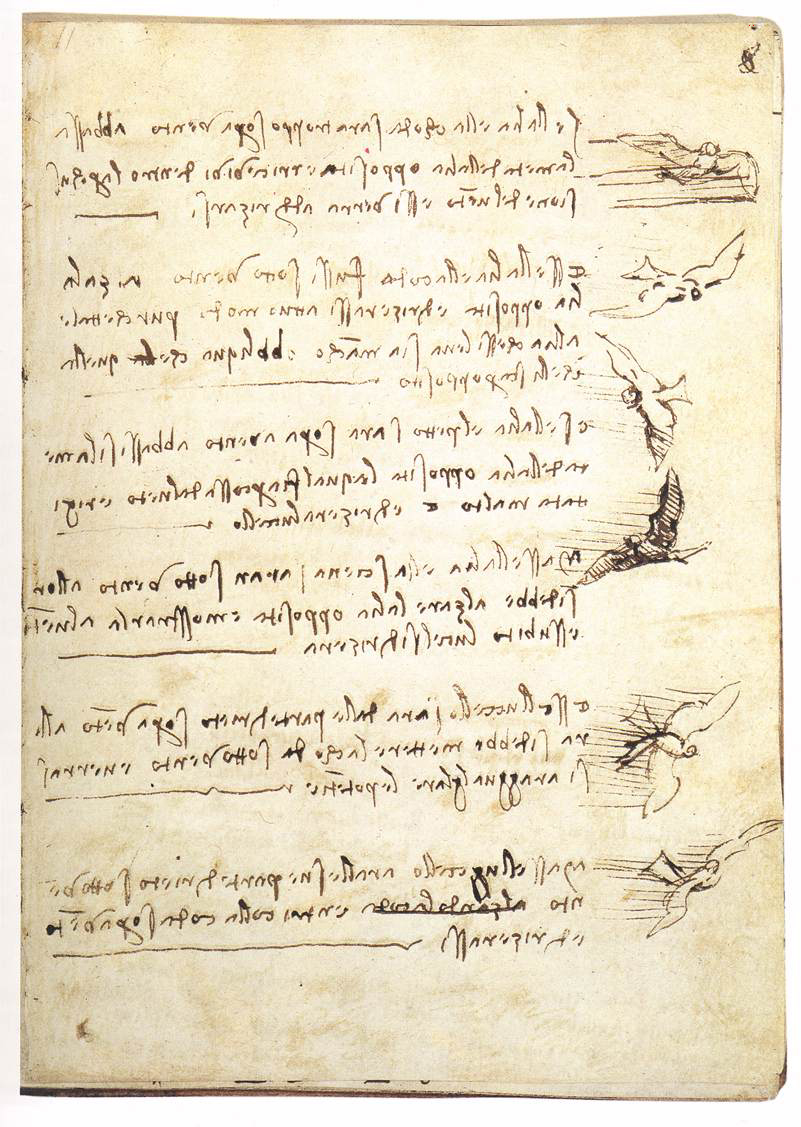
Leonardo wrote aerodynamic studies in a notebook eventually titled ''Codex on the Flight of Birds''.

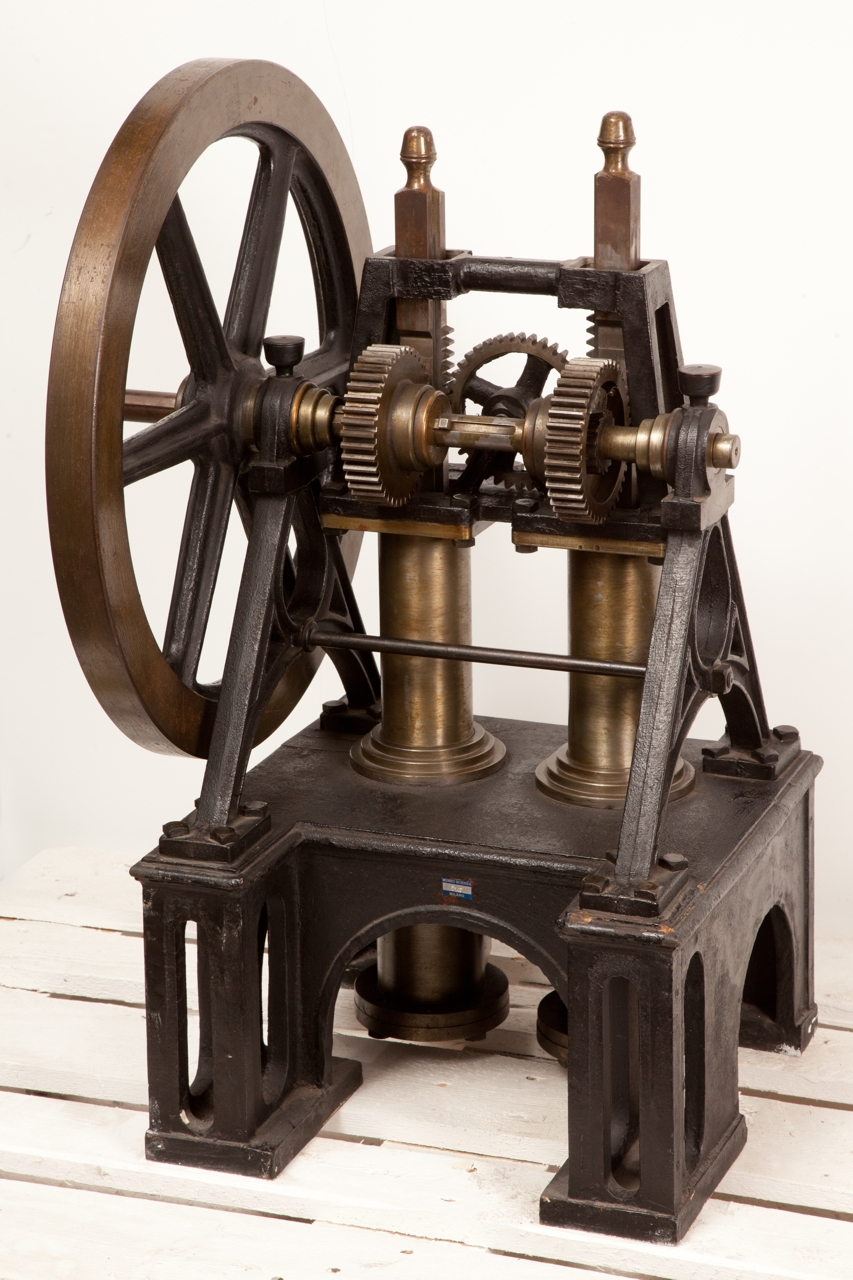
The Barsanti-Matteucci engine, the first proper internal combustion engine

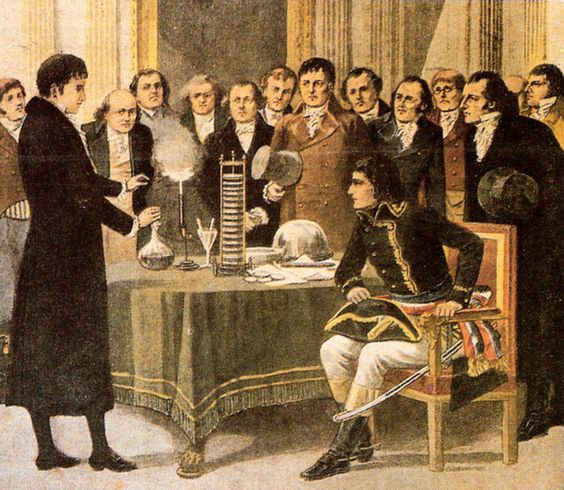
The voltaic pile presented by Alessandro Volta to Napoleone Bonaparte

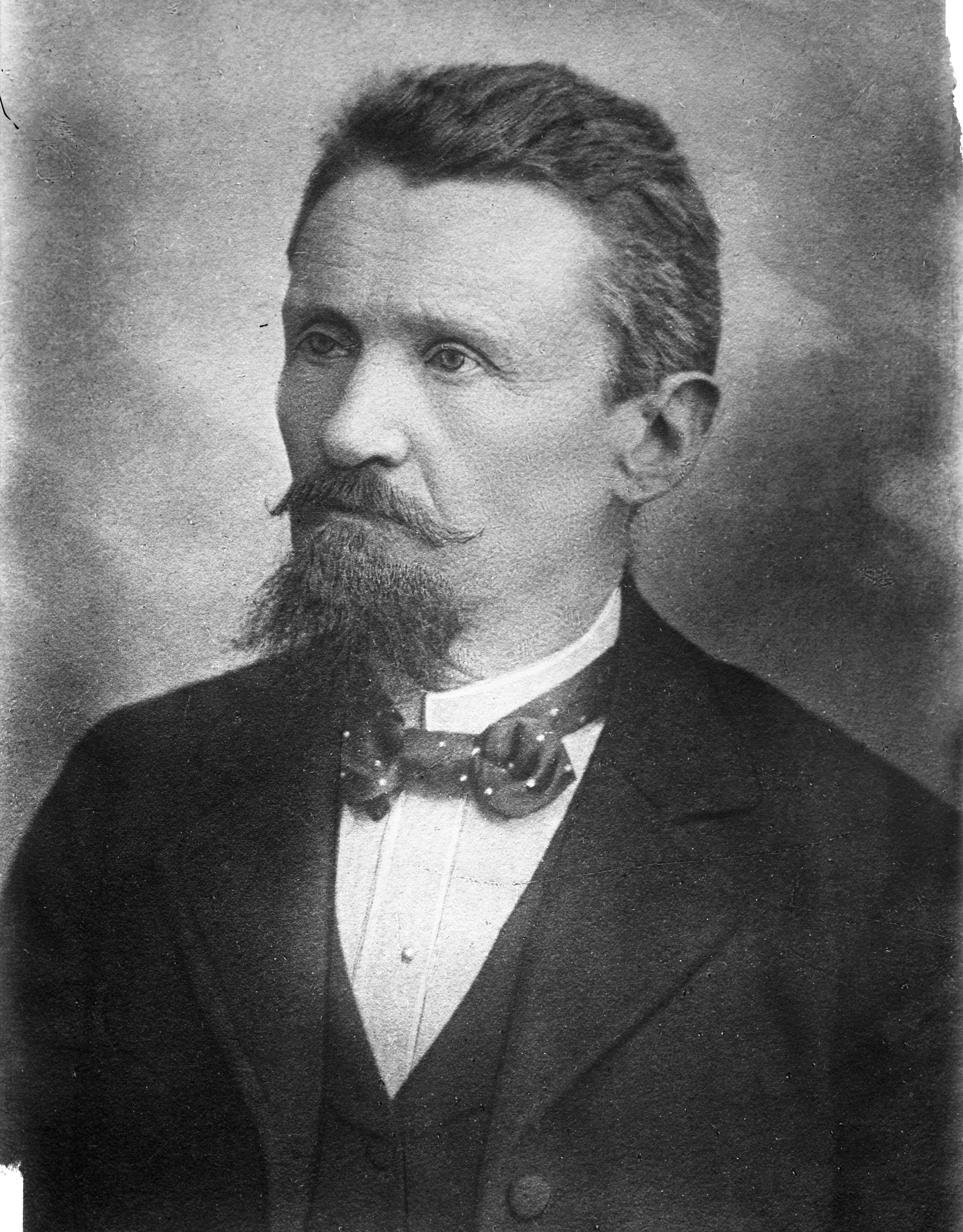
Alessandro Cruto, creator of the first practical long-lasting incandescent light bulb

Italian inventions and discoveries are objects, processes or techniques invented, innovated or discovered, partially or entirely, by Italians.

Italian people – living in the Italic peninsula or abroad – have been throughout history the source of important inventions and innovations in the fields of writing, calendar, mechanical and civil engineering, musical notation, celestial observation, perspective, warfare, long distance communication, storage and production of energy, modern medicine, polymerization and information technology.

Italians also contributed in theorizing civil law, scientific method (particularly in the fields of physics and astronomy), double-entry bookkeeping, mathematical algebra and analysis, classical and celestial mechanics. Often, things discovered for the first time are also called inventions and in many cases, there is no clear line between the two.

The following is a list of inventions, innovations or discoveries known or generally recognized to be Italian.

== Alphabetical list of Italian Inventions ==
=== A ===
- Roman acqueduct: Romans constructed aqueducts throughout the Republic and later Empire, to bring water from outside sources into cities and towns.
- Aircraft with tractor configuration propeller: the world's first airplane having a "Tractor" configuration, propeller on the front, was the Goupy No.2 (first flight on 11 March 1909) designed by Mario Calderara and financed by Ambroise Goupy at the French firm Blériot Aéronautique. At the time, it was the fastest airplane in existence. Later, this solution became the most common type of biplane used in the First World War.
- Amici prism: invented by Giovan Battista Amici
- Amici roof prism: invented by Giovan Battista Amici
- Anatomical theatre: used for teaching anatomy in early modern universities; the first one being at the university of Padova (1595).
- Anemometer: developed by Leon Battista Alberti in 1450.
- Arduino: an open source computer hardware and software company, project, and user community that designs and manufactures single-board microcontrollers and microcontroller kits for building digital devices and interactive objects that can sense and control objects in the physical world. It is now becoming an essential component for building AI Robots. It was created in 2003.
- Automatic rifle: the Cei-Rigotti is considered the first practical automatic rifle.

=== B ===
- Ballet: the earliest form of Ballet come from Renaissance Florence. It was Caterina De Medici who brought Ballet to France after her marriage.
- Bank: the Bank of San Giorgio opened for business in Genoa, Italy in 1149.
- Barometer: invented by Evangelista Torricelli in 1644.
- Electrochemical battery: constructed by Alessandro Volta in 1800, also known as Voltaic pile.

=== C ===
- Dipped candle: Romans made candles using rendered animal fat (called tallow), beginning around 500 BC.
- Caprotti valve gear: a valve design that found significant application in steam locomotives.
- Carbon paper, invented by Pellegrino Turri in 1806
- Casino: the first public, legal and government-owned casino was a Venetian four-story gambling house called "Ridotto", opened in 1638.
- Julian calendar: later perfected by Luigi Lilio becoming the Gregorian calendar, which is today's internationally accepted civil calendar, also known as the Western or Christian calendar.
- Cardan suspension of a gimbal: named after the Italian inventor Gerolamo Cardano (1501–1576), who described the device in detail. This device made inertial navigation possible.
- Cello: with 'The King Violoncello' by Andrea Amati being the earliest known bass instrument of the violin family to survive.
- Centrifugal Pump: the first machine that could be characterized as a centrifugal pump was a mud lifting machine that appeared as early as 1475 in a treatise by the Italian Renaissance engineer Francesco di Giorgio Martini.
- Codex: is the precursor of modern books, having defined the reference format of virtually all the books of Western civilization. Invented during Roman times, its adoption was later spread by Christianity.
- (Modern Diesel) Common Rail: designed by researcher Mario Ricco of the FIAT Group.
- Proportional compass: generally featuring a proportional scale, it could be used for calculus of infinitesimals and proportions of geometric figures. There are three types:
  - Reduction compass: developed by Commandino Federico (inventor of the polymetric compass) and Joost Bürgi.
  - Proportional eight spikes compass: invented by Fabrizio Mordente and used by G. Bruno in his research of the physical minimum.
  - Flat hands compass: such as Galilei's one.
- Roman concrete: for edification purposes, more resilient than modern concrete.
- Confetti: initially meaning a type of sweet, then used for analogy to indicate little chalk balls used in Italy during carnival festivities. Mangilli di Crescenzago (Milan) is credited as an early inventor of paper confetti.
- Connecting rod: a device invented by Roman engineers to transform circular motion into linear motion.
- Corvus: Roman naval boarding device.
- Composite order: Imperial Roman form of the Corinthian order.
- Cruise ship: The Kingdom of the Two Sicilies — whose territory today corresponds to much of southern Italy, historically a key destination of the Grand Tour — offered what is considered the first cruise in history aboard the Francesco I. Built in 1831, the Francesco I departed from Naples in early June 1833, following a dedicated advertising campaign. Nobles, officials, and royal princes from across Europe boarded the vessel, which over the course of a little more than three months sailed to Taormina, Catania, Syracuse, Malta, Corfu, Patras, Delphi, Zante, Athens, Smyrna, and Constantinople, providing passengers with excursions and guided tours.

=== D ===
- Dental fillings: First mentioned by Cornelius Celsus in the 1st century AD.
- Dentures: the first dentures were developed by the Etruscans in 700 BC
- Di Pietro air engine: a pneumatic engine built by Angelo Di Pietro, which require very low pressure to start rotation. This engine produces almost no vibration, internal wear or friction and is potentially useful for a wide range of environment-friendly applications. In 2004, it has 100% more efficiency than any other air engine to that date. It also represents the first air engine that could be applied in transportation.
- Dipleidoscope: invented by Giovan Battista Amici.
- Dollying: to move a camera on a dolly, esp. toward or away from the subject being filmed or televised. Giovanni Pastrone first used this method in 1914.
- Doppio Borgato: a musical instrument which is a variation of the piano
- Double-entry bookkeeping system (for accounting): developed in the mercantile city-states of medieval Italy and first documented by Lucas de Burgo in Venice. Perfected by Amatino Mannucci in the 14th century. The actual invention could have been Roman or Asiatic. Anyway, the system reached a huge diffusion as a consequence of Italian use and theorisation, with Summa de Arithmetica containing the rules of double-entry, the first example of calculating a neperian logarithm as well as early examples of probability calculus.
- Doxorubicin: a chemotherapy agent invented by Farmitalia Spa in the 1950s.
- D-Shape: a new 3D printer capable of printing entire buildings invented in 2004 by Enrico Dini.

=== E ===
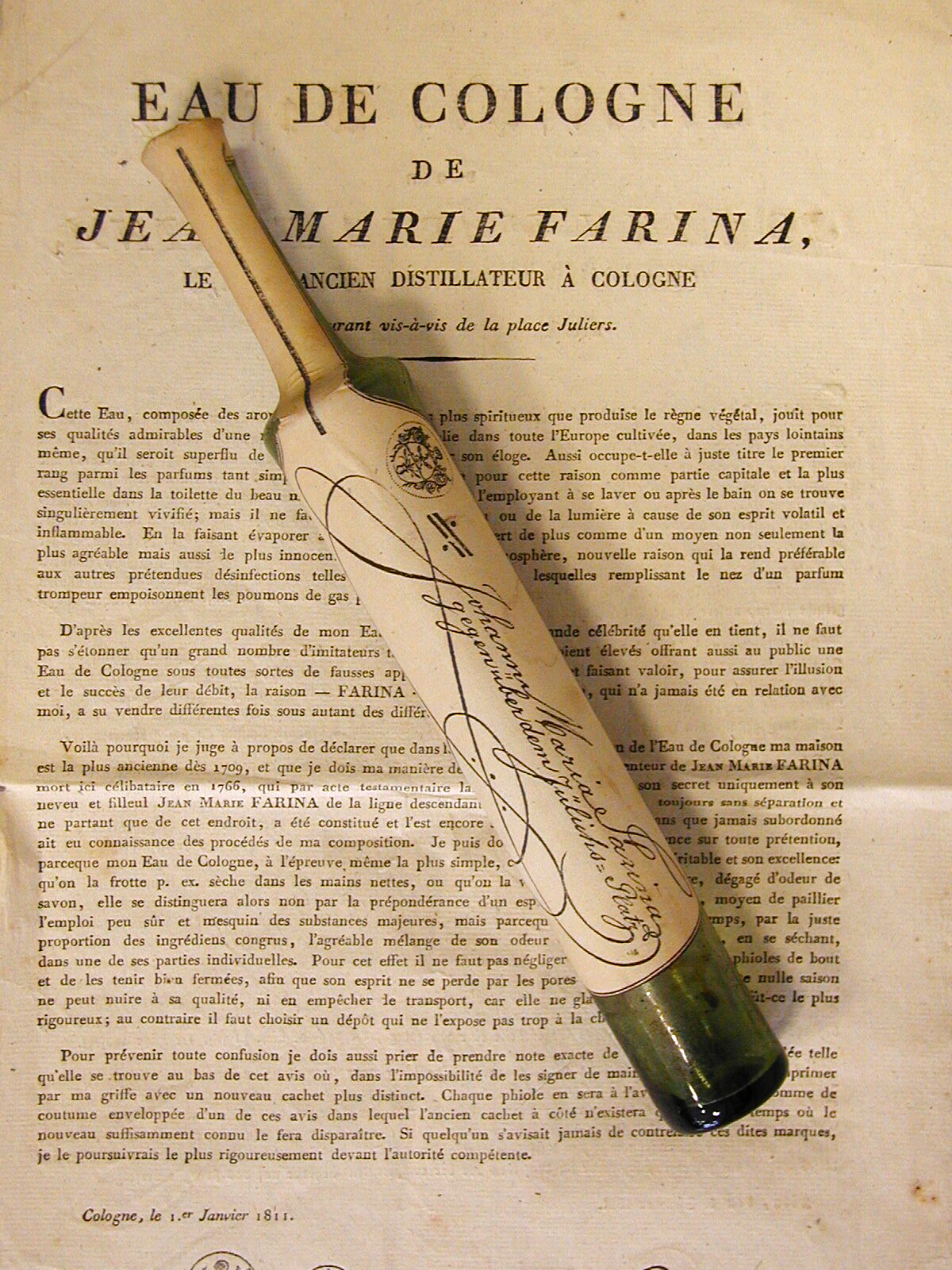
Eau de Cologne, perfume developed by Johann Maria Farina in 1709.

- Eau de Cologne: perfume developed by Johann Maria Farina in 1709.
- Electroplating: a manufacturing technique invented by Luigi Valentino Brugnatelli in 1805. He pioneered galvanoplastic experiments, introducing the technique of electroplating. His acquaintance with A. Volta played an important role in his scientific career. He hypothesized that in the chemical pile there was also a transport of atoms, obtaining experimental evidence of this. He discovered the properties of coal cathodes as electrical conductors and succeeded in covering them with a metallic layer. He sensed the possible applications in the industrial field, sharing this procedure with a Pavese goldsmith, who used it.
- Encyclopedia: from the Greek enkýklios paidèia, meaning a set of doctrines constituting a complete education. The comprehensive works of Aristotle can be considered encyclopedic (covering politics, rhetoric, ethic, aesthetic, psychology, biology, math). The first Latin encyclopedia was written by Cato the Elder in an attempt to mitigate the influence of Greek culture. He wrote for his son an "encyclopedia" of what he believed to be the necessary subjects for the Roman citizen: agriculture, rhetoric, medicine, law and warfare. Marcus T. Varro wrote a second, more complete and systematic encyclopedia, covering nine disciplines: grammar, rhetoric, logic, arithmetic, geometry, astronomy, musical theory, medicine, and architecture. Plinius the Elder wrote Historia naturalis, the first encyclopedia to survive as a complete work. Marziano F. Capella wrote an allegoric encyclopedia in prose and verses, De nuptiis Mercurii et Philologiae. These encyclopedias, along with the works of Cassiodorus and Boethius, paved the way for the medieval seven liberal arts.
- Epidemiology (innovated): Roman scholar Marcus Varro mentioned microorganisms as a possible causal agent of diseases. Girolamo Fracastoro, in the mid 16th century, was the first one to scientifically state the real nature of germs, infection, and contagious ways of disease transmission. He attributed the causes of diseases to very small living particles, invisible to the eye. They were considered vulnerable to fire, capable of self multiplying as well as spreading by air.
- Espresso machine:
  - first prototype invented by Angelo Moriondo in 1884 in Turin.
  - (piston driven model) invented by Achille Gaggia in 1945.
- Estimo: discipline, part of economic science, which establishes the logical and methodological principles allowing a reasoned, objective and generally valid formulation of the esteem of the monetary value of economic goods. The first estimative surveys of a normative character took shape with the Italian Catasti a Valore (translated, land-value registers), called Estimi a Apprezzi. Florentine estimate method was already codified in the thirteenth century. From the sixteenth century the land, merchant and then civil esteems of the capital began to spread in Italy. The first modern treaty on Estimo was Trattato della stima dei Beni Stabili by Cosimo Trinci, who introduced the concept of ascending and descending influences on the capitalization rate according to the different land's characteristics. Also see Roman Cadastre.
- Eudiometer: invented by Alessandro Volta and Marsilio Landriani. Thanks to this instrument Lavoisier discovered the chemical composition of water.
- Eyeglasses: originating from Italy, the eyeglasses were perhaps the invention of an unidentified Venetian glassmaker of the 13th century. The research of Roger Bacon on magnifying glasses probably aided their future development.

=== F ===
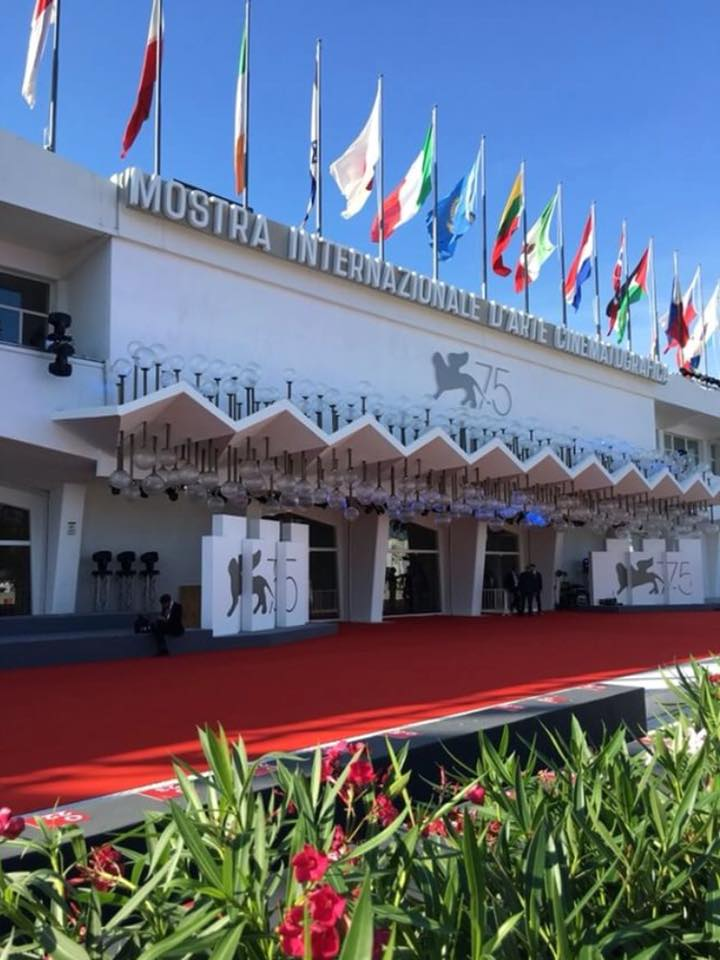
The Venice Film Festival, the world's oldest film festival, was established in 1932.

- Film festival: founded as Esposizione d'Arte Cinematografica, the Venice Film Festival was established in 1932.
- Forlanini helicopter: first engine-powered helicopter. A steam powered helicopter which first flew in 1877, designed by Enrico Forlanini in Milan. This has represented the first heavier-than-air aircraft lifting from the ground with autonomous means. Italian engineering will further develop the helicopter: on 7 April 1925 Corradino d'Ascanio patented the helicopter with two coaxial propellers. Other patents and inventions related to the aeronautical world followed.
- Firefighting: The earliest firefighters were in the city of Rome. In 60 A.D., Roman emperor Nero established a corps of Vigiles, to protect Rome from disastrous fires.

=== G ===
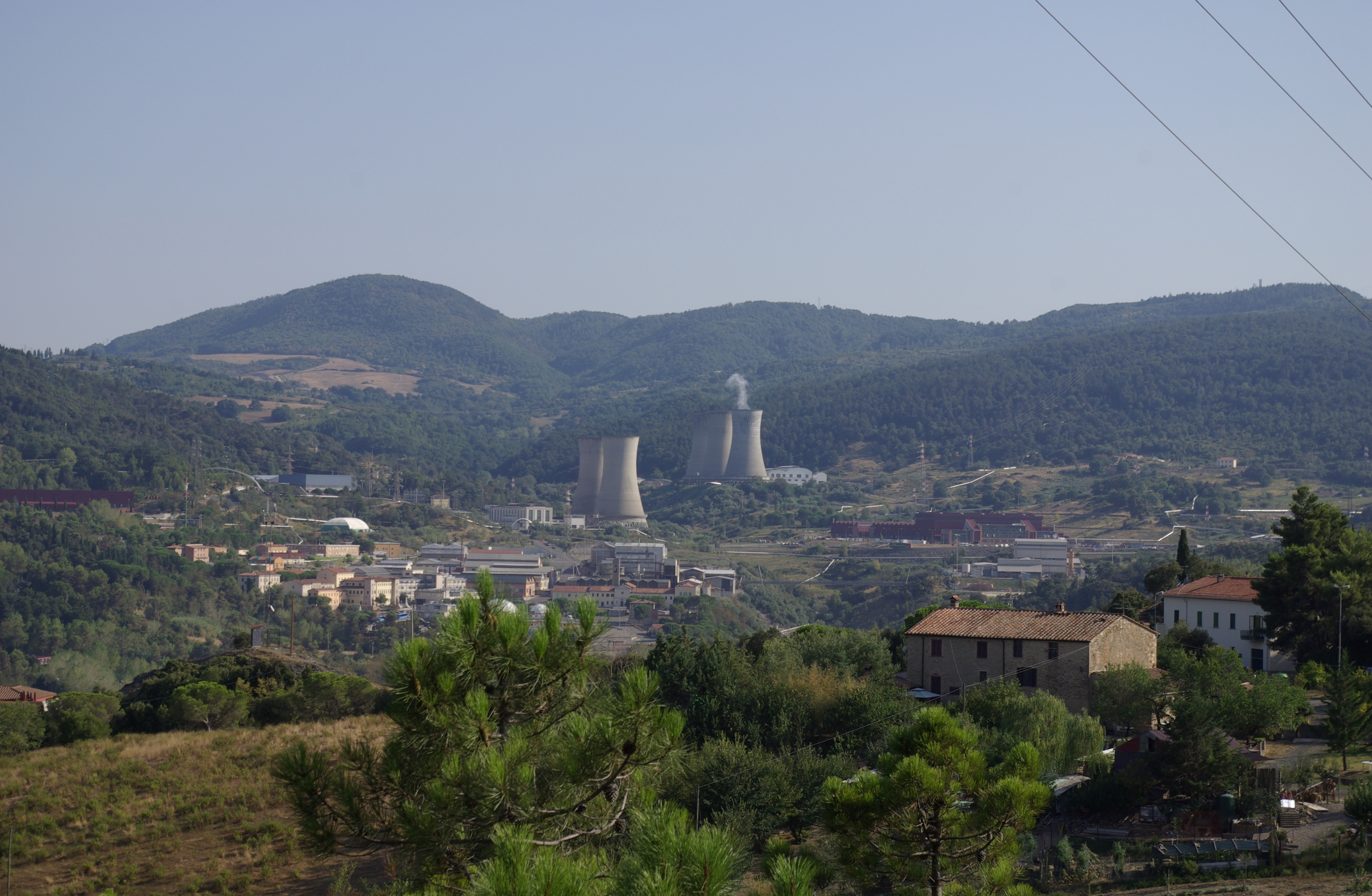
View of Larderello with one of the biggest geothermal plant in Italy. Piero Ginori Conti was the inventor of the first geothermal power plant in the world

- Galleon (origins): historical evidence suggests that this iconic type of ship was pioneered by the early 16th century Venetians and later spread to Iberian Peninsula, where it became widely adopted and further developed.
- Gelato: Procopio Cutò is credited with being the inventor of modern gelato. In 1903 Italo Marchioni patented a machine for producing the gelato cone.
- (Modern) giro system: a payment transfer from one bank account to another bank account initiated by the payer, not the payee. The first occurrences of book money can be traced back in Northern Italy and, in particular, in Venice.
- Geothermal power plant: the first one being built in Tuscany (1904) by Piero Ginori Conti. The first Italian industrial use of geothermal energy dates 1827.
- Ghetto, with the institution of the Venetian Ghetto early in 1516.
- Gondola: a typical Venetian boat.
- Grappling hook: The device was invented by the Romans in approximately 260 BC.
- Guildhall: The first guildhalls appeared in Rome.

=== H ===
- Herbarium: intended as a collection of plants classified under scientific methods, was first established in Bologna in 1534 by Luca Ghini.
- Holocene calendar: a calendar obtained by adding 10000 years to the current Gregorian calendar, first proposed by Cesare Emiliani in 1993.
- Hydrofoil: a lifting surface that operates in water: Enrico Forlanini developed and patented around 1900 a "ladder" foil system.
- Hyper Search: a type of web search engine based on link analysis invented in 1997 by Massimo Marchiori, whose algorithm played an important role in the development of Google page ranking.

=== I ===
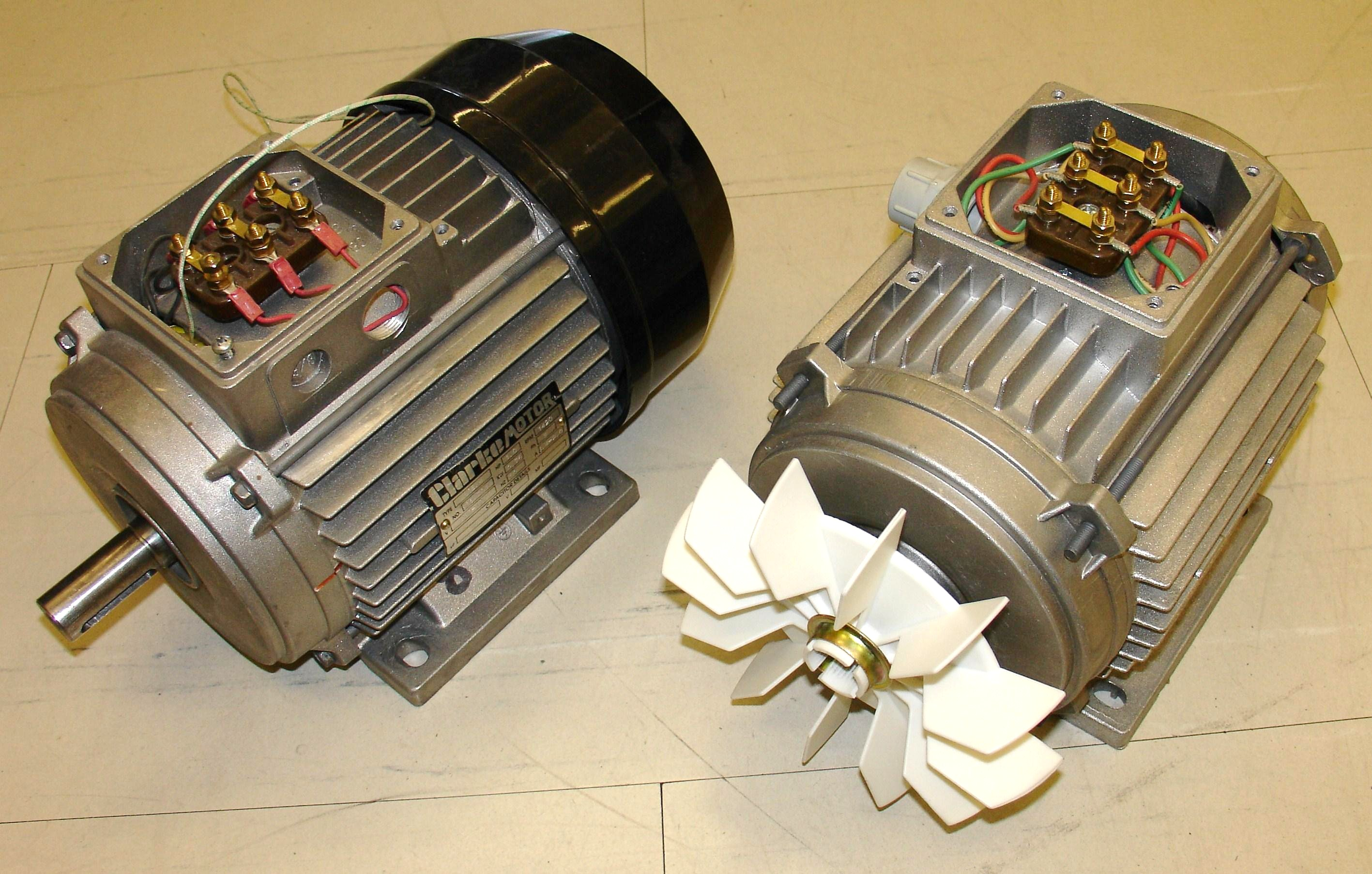
The Induction motor, invented by Galileo Ferraris. He was the first one to demonstrate this invention in 1885; around the same time, Nikola Tesla independently developed a similar invention.

- Induction motor: Galileo Ferraris invented the AC commutator-free three-phase induction motor. He was the first one to demonstrate this invention in 1885; around the same time, Nikola Tesla independently developed a similar invention.
- Intel 4004: designed by Federico Faggin, who etched his initials "FF" on a corner of the chip prototype as his signature. Faggin, Marcian Hoff and Stanley Mazor have been awarded with the National Medal of Technology and Innovation by the President of the United States Barack Obama for their work in creating the first commercial microprocessor.
- Intel 8080: the first high-performance 8-bit microprocessor in the market, using the faster n-channel SGT. The 8080 was conceived and designed by Faggin, and designed by Masatoshi Shima under Faggin's supervision.
- Italic typeface: Designed in the early 1500 by the book-printer Francesco Griffo.
- Infill: The earliest type of infill, called opus craticum by the Romans.
- Ice resurfacer: Frank Zamboni invented the ice resurfacer which is named after him.

=== J ===
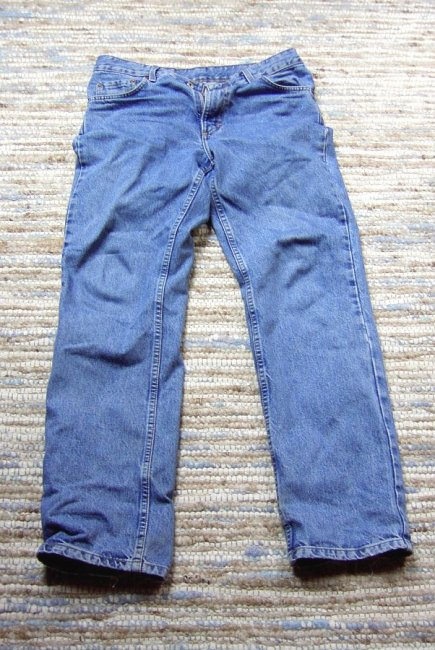
Jeans, a type of trousers originated from the city of Genoa, Italy (hence the name)

- Jacuzzi Spa: founded in 1915 by seven Italian brothers from Northern Italy and led by Giocondo and Candido Jacuzzi. Its first product was a portable hydrotherapy unit that sat in the bath.
- Jeans: type of trousers originated from the city of Genoa, Italy (hence the name). Modern Jeans have been invented by Jacob Davis and Levi Strauss in 1873.
- Jumping position in horsemanship: developed by Federico Caprilli.

=== L ===
- Launeddas (or Sardinian triple clarinet): typical Sardinian woodwind instrument composed by three pipes.
- Lazaret (quarantine station): the first was founded by the Republic of Venice in 1403, on a small island in the Venetian lagoon.
- Light bulb (partially innovated): Alessandro Cruto built the first light bulb having a carbon filament treated with ethylene. The filament, under high pressure and temperature, acquires a positive resistance coefficient (when temperature increases, resistance increases as well). Cruto's bulb was officially lit 5 months after Edison bulb (on 4 March 1880). Cruto's filament improved the durability of the bulb from Edison's 40 hours to 500 hours of lighting.

=== M ===
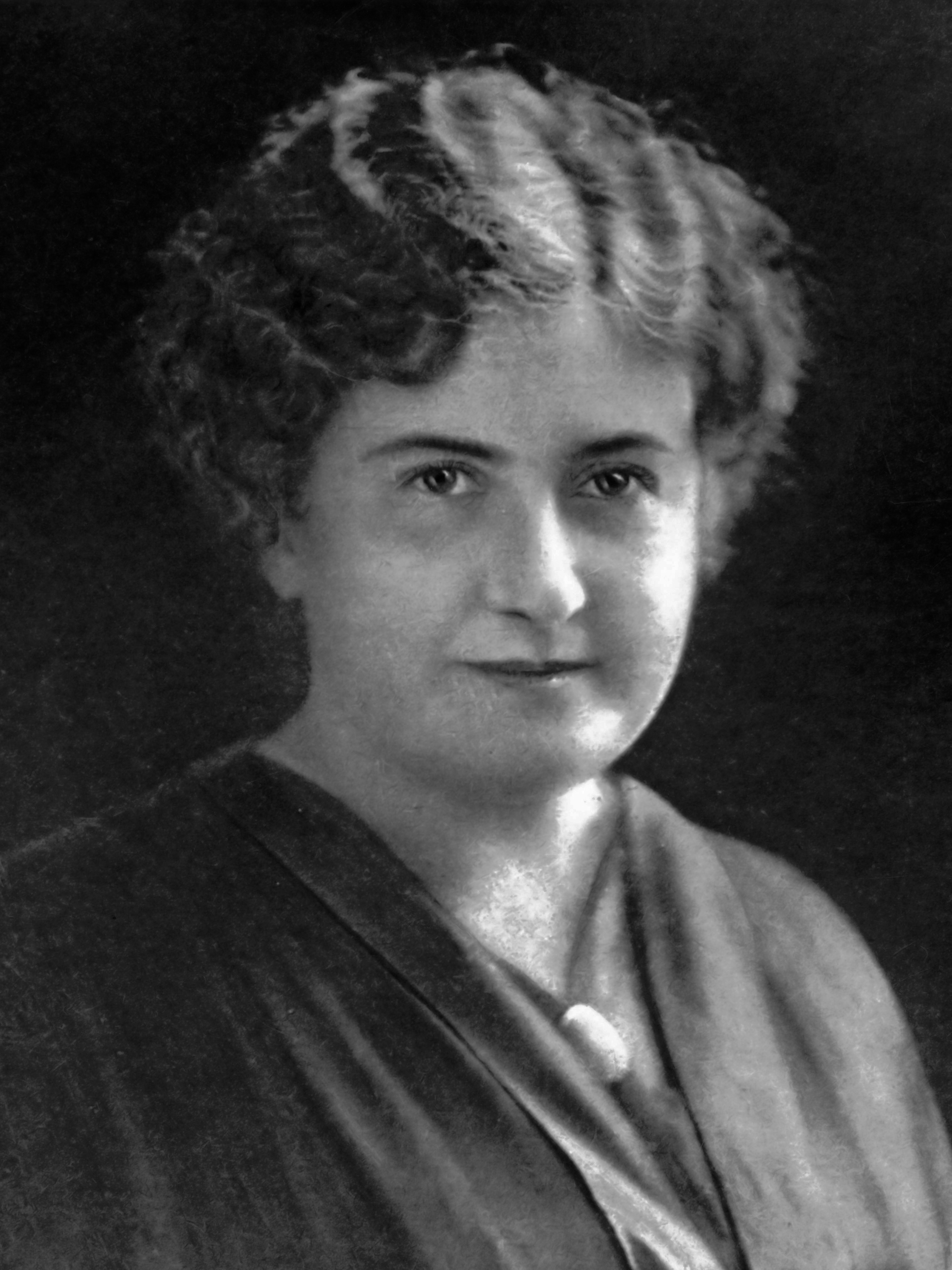
Maria Montessori developed Montessori education, a child-centered educational approach, in 1907

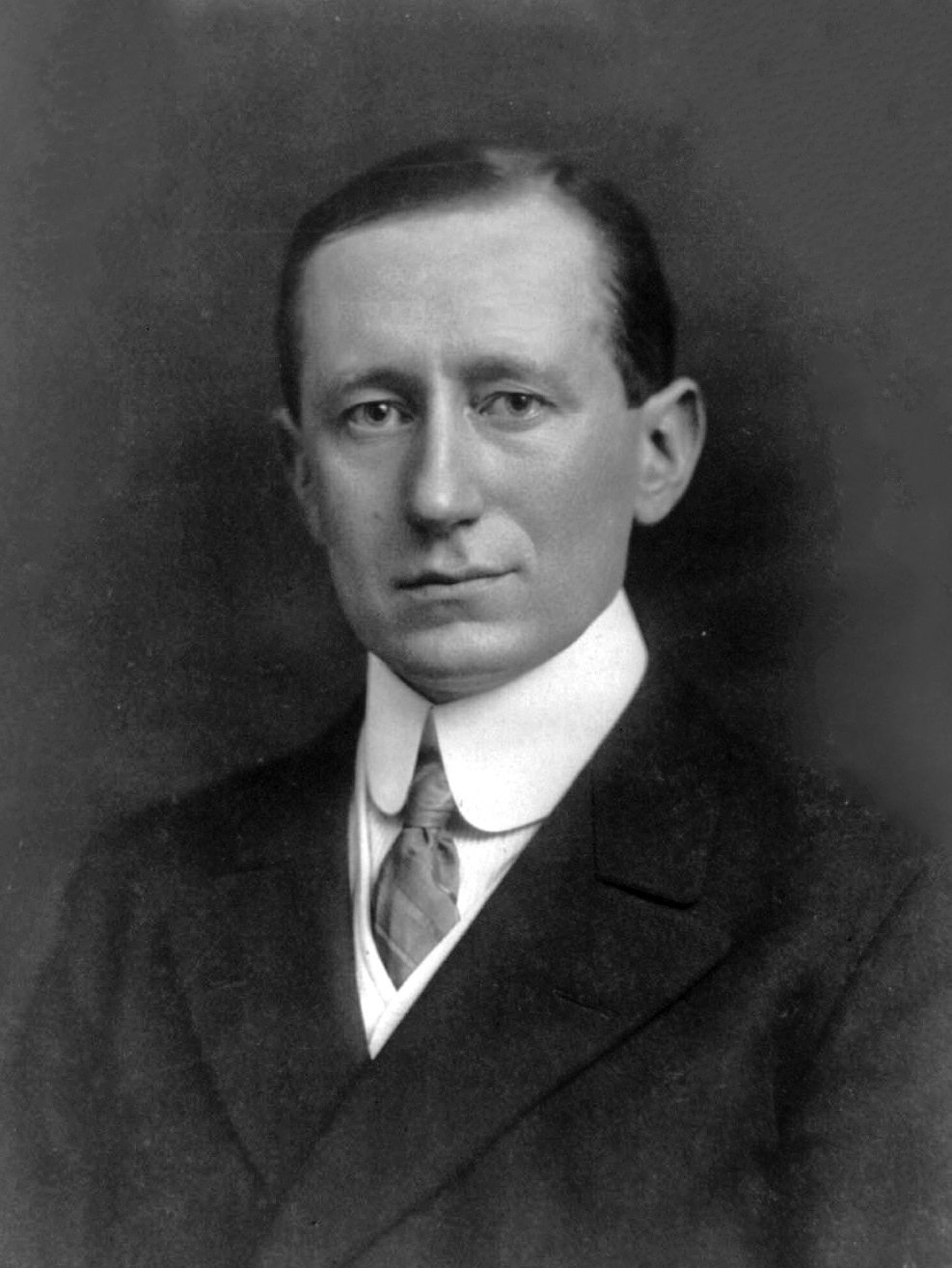
Guglielmo Marconi, inventor of the radio and the father of the wireless communication

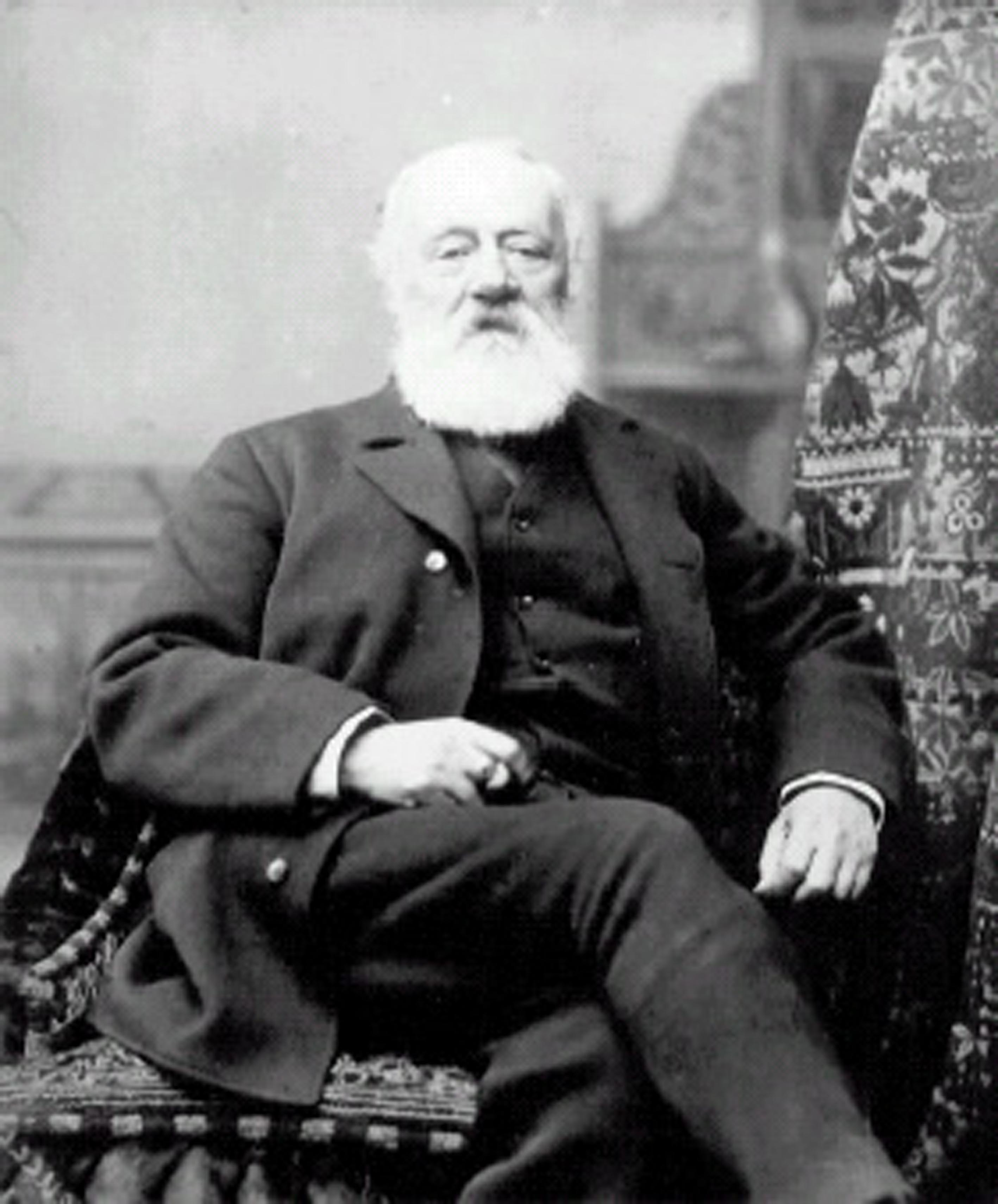
Antonio Meucci developed a voice-communication apparatus that several sources credit as the first telephone.

- Mandolin: a string instrument played with a plectrum.
- Maiolica: originated in Central Italy.
- Guglielmo Marconi, inventor of the radio and the father of the wireless communication
- Mater-Bi: different classes of plastic-like starch-based biodegradable kind of polymers researched and mass-produced by the Italian company Novamont.
- Medical thermometer: invented by Sanctorius in the early 1600s.
- Microscope: Sometimes credited as the first compound microscope, Galileo Galilei found after 1610 that he could close focus his telescope, maybe even turning it around backwards, to view near by small objects. This method was combersom since he had to extend his 2 foot long telescope out to 6 feet to view objects that close. After seeing a purpose-built compound microscope by Drebbel exhibited in Rome in 1624, Galileo built his own improved version. Giovanni Faber coined the name microscope for the compound microscope Galileo submitted to the Accademia dei Lincei in 1625 (Galileo had called it the "occhiolino" or "little eye").
- Antonio Meucci developed a voice-communication apparatus that several sources credit as the first telephone.
- Microscopic anatomy and histology: pioneered by Marcello Malpighi in the 1660s.
- Mile: a unit of distance based on the distance covered in 1,000 steps by a Roman legionnaire.
- Milestone: Romans came up with this invention to measure the distances of the roads.
- Mitre gates: on a Canal lock in a canal, gates that remain closed by the pressure of the water itself; developed and possibly invented by Leonardo da Vinci and still used today in all canals worldwide such as the Panama Canal.
- Moka pot: a type of coffeemaker invented by Alfonso Bialetti.
- Montessori education: child-centered educational approach developed by Maria Montessori in 1907.
- Monopole antenna: invented by Guglielmo Marconi in 1895.
- Moon Boot: created in 1970 by Italian company Tecnica.
- (Petroleum internal-combustion) motorcycle: in 1884 Enrico Bernardi built the first vehicle in the world powered by a petrol engine, a tricycle called Motrice Pia; Karl Friedrich Benz developed a similar metallic motor tricycle in the following year (1885). A motorcycle is a two- or three-wheeled motor vehicle. Firsts known petroleum motorcycles are the Daimler Reitwagen with 2 wheels plus 2 outriggers (1885), and the Butler Petrol Cycle with 3 wheels plus 2 castors (1887). In 1893 Bernardi mounted a petrol engine on a propulsion wheel for an ordinary bicycle, thus, according to what Enrico Fermi wrote for the Treccani Encyclopedia, creating the first motorcycle. Bernardi is to be considered one of the pioneers of the automobile too. He partnered with the Miari e Giusti to produce three- and four-wheeled automobiles powered by the gasoline engine he had invented and patented in 1882. The Bernardi mod 3,5 HP (1896) features many of his innovations, such as geometrically correct steering, cylinder with detachable head, overhead valves and a centrifugal inlet valve regulator. The quality of the vehicles was demonstrated by travelling for 60000 km without engine failure.
- Motorways: as a controlled access highway that directly connects two cities: Autostrada Milan-Varese in 1924.
- Moving Picture Experts Group Standard: MPEG Standard has been a collective and international effort in which the Italian engineer Leonardo Chiariglione played a major role: the Movie Picture Experts Group was founded by L. Chiariglione and the Japanese Hiroshi Yasuda.
- Multi-mirror telescope: made possible by the pioneering work and research of Guido Horn d'Arturo.

=== N ===
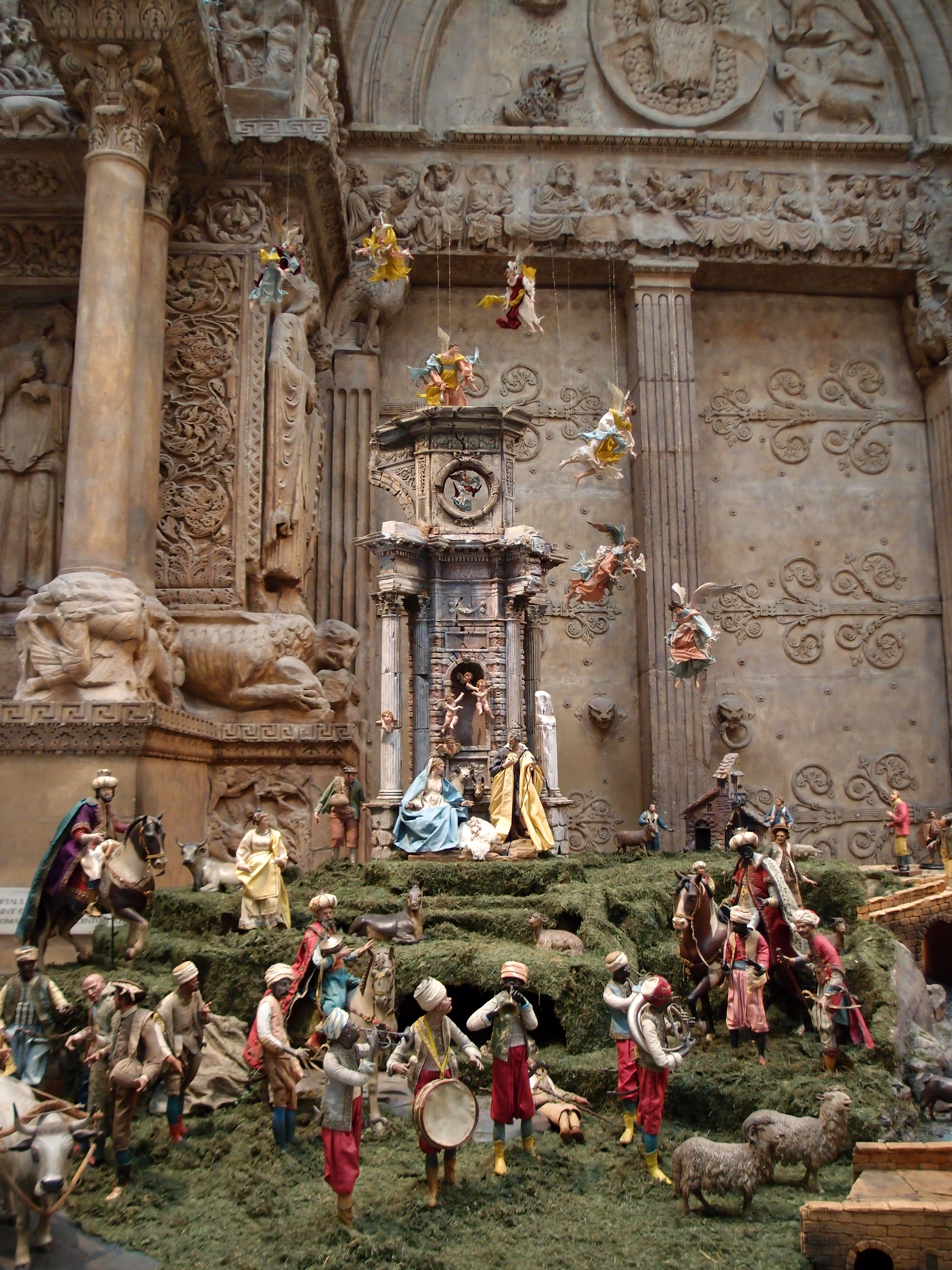
The Nativity Scene, developed from the sacred Christmas representations in the churches, linked to the living crib of San Francesco d'Assisi in Greccio

- Nativity Scene: developed from the sacred Christmas representations in the churches, linked to the living crib of San Francesco d'Assisi in Greccio. Dominicans, Franciscans and Jesuits spread the nativity scene in Italy and Europe.
- Newspaper: first newspapers started circulating in Venice in 1563; they were originally named Gazette, news-sheets reporting an abstract of current events and facts.
- Nitroglycerin: first synthesized by Ascanio Sobrero in 1847.

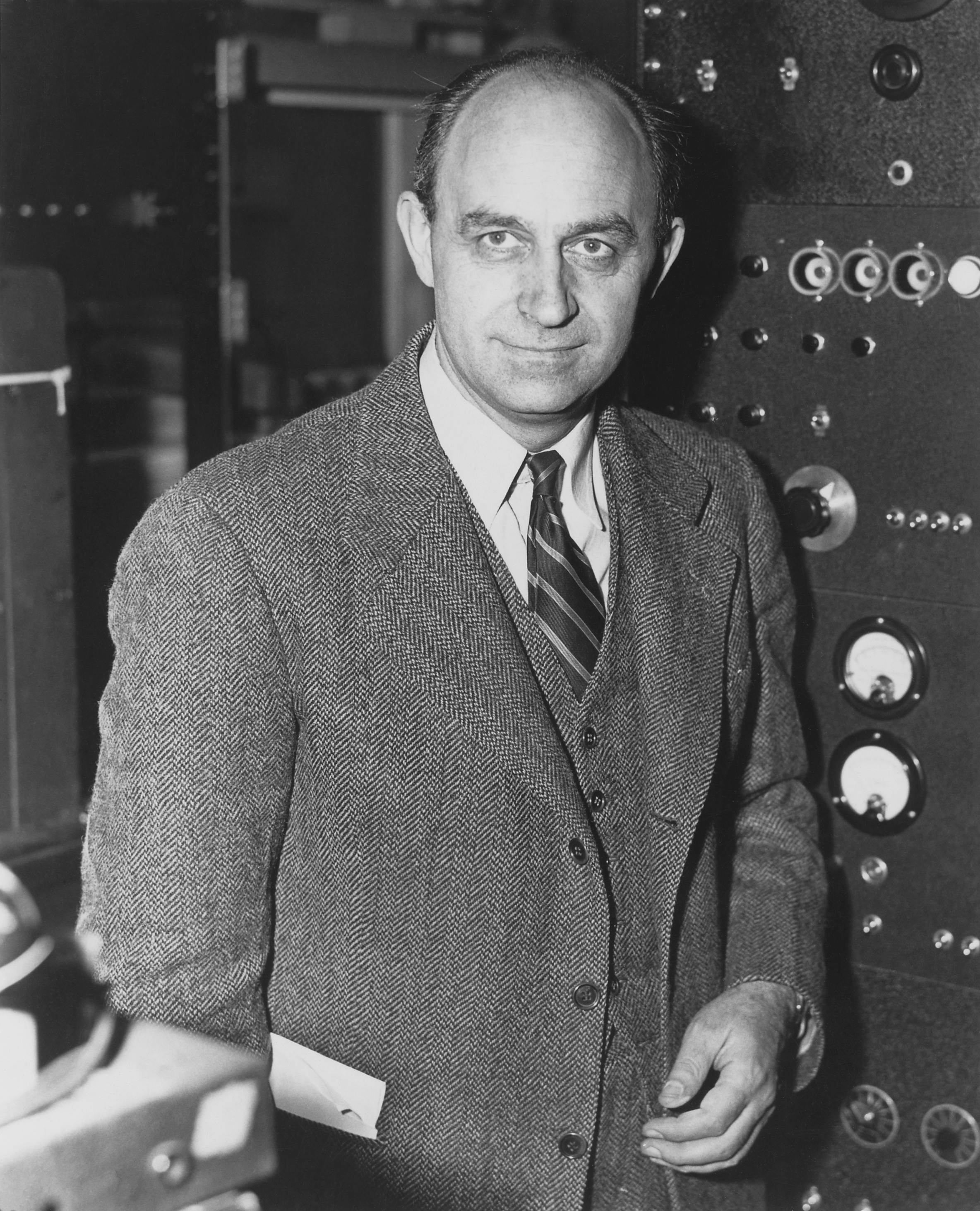
Enrico Fermi, creator of the world's first nuclear reactor. He has been called the "architect of the nuclear age" and the "architect of the atomic bomb".

- Nuclear reactor: the first working fission nuclear reactor was constructed by a team led by Enrico Fermi, who is regarded as the 'father of nuclear age'. Nuclear fission, converting part of the mass in energy, is far more efficient than other, fossil energy sources.

=== O ===
- Ocarina: musical instrument invented by Giuseppe Donati
- Opera House: the first public opera house was the "Teatro San Cassiano" opened in Venice in 1637 and survived until 1800.

=== P ===
Parachute dates back to the Renaissance Italy

- Paddle boat: first designed by Leonardo da Vinci in the 1490s
- Pantelegraph: a device for telegraphic transmission of writing and drawing invented by Giovanni Caselli. Commercial service started in 1865. It was the first functional Fax Machine to enter commercial service
- Parachute: dates back to the Renaissance Italy
- Pasta's industrial production: in 1740 the Venetian Paolo Adami opened the first pasta factory. Buitoni mechanical pasta factory, founded in 1827, is the oldest in the world. The French machine Marseillais Purifier speeded up the separation of semolina flour from the bran. In Italy various artificial exsiccation techniques were developed.
- Pasteurization:
  - Technique known since the century XII in Asia and used both in China and Japan for alcoholic beverages preservation.
  - Scientific proof given by Lazzaro Spallanzani in 1768, disproving the theory of spontaneous generation.
- Personal Computer (in a broad sense, not referring to the modern IBM PC compatible architecture): due to the pioneering work of Pier Giorgio Perotto
- Perspective: linear perspective was invented by the Renaissance architect Filippo Brunelleschi, whose system depicts how objects shrink in size according to their distance from the eye. Perspective was later reported in "Della pittura" (1435) by Leon Battista Alberti.
- Piano: an acoustic, stringed musical instrument played using a keyboard, with hammers striking the strings, invented by Bartolomeo Cristofori in 1709.

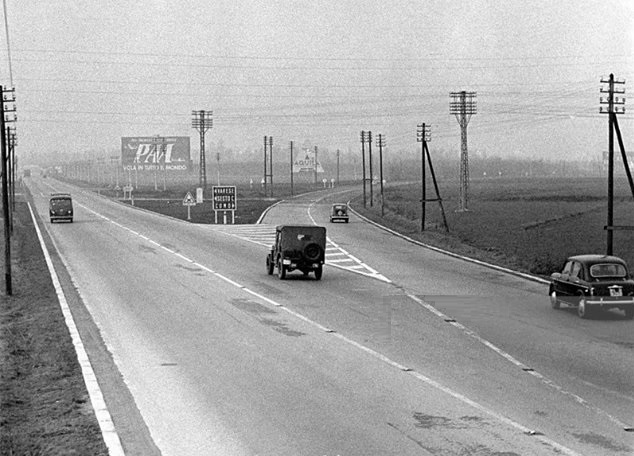
The Autostrada dei Laghi ('Lakes Motorway'; now parts of the Autostrada A8 and Autostrada A9) in the 1950s, the first motorway built in the world. It was ideated by Piero Puricelli

- Piero Puricelli: Italian engineer and politician in the first half of the 20th century who was responsible for the ideation, in Italy, of the first motorways in the world, the Autostrada dei Laghi, connecting Milan to Lake Como and Lake Maggiore.
- Pistol: first handheld guns were probably created in the city of Pistoia around 1540. Anyway, the etymology of the word is still debated. In 1833 Francesco Antonio Broccu built the first prototype of the (percussion cap) revolver, which was later independently conceived and mass-produced by the American Samuel Colt.
- Pizzeria: established in 1738 as a stand for peddlers, Antica Pizzeria Port'Alba was opened in 1830 in Naples.
- Polypropylene:
  - (as a crystalline isotactic polymer) first synthesized by the Italian Giulio Natta and, independently, by the German Karl Rehn, beginning to be manufactured in Italy in 1957.
  - (as a syndiotactic polymer) first synthesized by Giulio Natta and his coworkers.
- Porro prism: invented by Ignazio Porro.

=== Q ===
- Quick release skewer (for attaching a wheel to a bicycle): invented by Tullio Campagnolo in 1927; he was also among the early innovators of the rod gear derailleur, introducing an anterior dual gears derailleur (in addition to the posterior).

=== R ===
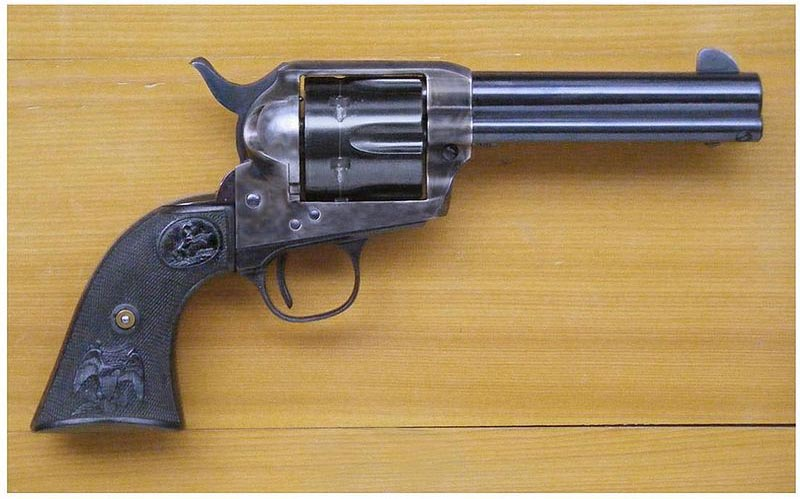
The Revolver was invented in 1833 by the Italian artisan and inventor Francesco Antonio Broccu (1797–1882), born in Gadoni, Sardinia.

- Radio: developed, successfully tested in 1895 by Guglielmo Marconi and produced on industrial scale as a long-distance communication medium. Marconi partially relied on similar technologies developed by the Serbian inventor Nikola Tesla. Both inventors have always had an independent interest in wireless technology and patents issued and reversed suited the economical needs of the time.
- Radiogoniometer: radio-electric apparatus that enables to determinate the direction, and thus the position, of transmission of the radio waves emitted. Applied in radio-assisted navigation, it represented the oldest (as well as one of the most important) instrument. To the development contributed Ettore Bellini, militar engineer Alessandro Tosi, and Alessandro Artom (inventor of the "cross-frame" r. for long and medium length waves transmitters).
- Reggio Emilia approach: an educational method to be applied in preschooling.
- Revolver: The Italian artisan and inventor Francesco Antonio Broccu (1797–1882), born in Gadoni, Sardinia, is regarded as the first developer of the Revolver, realised by him in 1833.
- RFID (Radio Frequency Identification): the first RFID system was patented in America by the Italian-American Mario Cardullo. The system itself derives from the IFF transponder, which had been introduced by Great Britain during WWII. This RFID technology was used for the telepass, a smart card allowing the driver to pass through a motorway's toll station without halting the vehicle, as well as other contactless mobile payments.

=== S ===
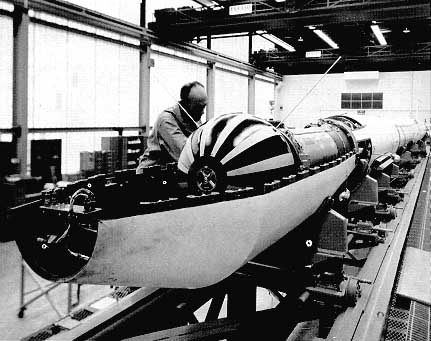
The San Marco 1, a satellite of historical relevance: Italy was the third country, after the Soviet Union and the United States, to successfully launch a satellite, in 1964

- San Marco 1: a satellite of historical relevance: Italy was the third country, after the Soviet Union and the United States, to successfully launch a satellite, in 1964.
- School (partially innovated): at the height of the Roman Republic (and later during the Empire) parents were expected to have their children alphabetized and educated (albeit with partial gender discrimination on the specific subjects), especially in order to enter a political career. Formal schools were established and arranged in progressive and meritocratic tiers. In the words of Quintilian, a teacher in the 1st century AD: "Some boys are lazy, unless forced to work; others do not like being controlled; some will respond to fear but others are paralyzed by it. Give me a boy who is encouraged by praise, delighted by success and ready to weep over failure." The rigorous educational method and curriculum used in Rome was copied in its provinces, providing a basis for education systems throughout later Western civilization.
- Science academy: the first scientific society was the Academia Secretorum Naturae founded in Naples in 1560 by the polymath Giambattista della Porta.
- Seawalls: ancient Rome pioneered concrete sea walls.
- Secchi disk: created by Angelo Secchi used to measure water transparency or turbidity in bodies of water
- (Modern) electromagnetic seismograph: in 1855 Luigi Palmieri realizes a seismograph consisting of U-shaped tubes oriented on the different cardinal directions, filling them with mercury. When an earthquake shakes the ground, the motion of the mercury produces an electrical contact that stops a clock and at the same time starts a recording drum registering the motion of a float on the surface of mercury. Results are: time of occurrence, relative intensity and duration. In 1875 Filippo Cecchi introduces the first pendulum seismograph in which the relative motion of the pendulums (with respect to ground motions) is recorded as a function of time.
- Roman Senate: a deliberative assembly of the Romans, lasting from the 8th century BC to at least the 7th century AD. The term senate comes from the Latin senatus or "Assembly of Elders". Previous councils of elders are known in Greece and in the Greek cities of Hellenistic and Roman ages; there was also a similar organism in Carthage. Rome established the senate as one of the fundamental institutions of the state and, for a long time, the main responsible for both domestic and foreign policy. Until the 15th century, the magistracy of the (roman) senator appointed by the Pope, along with magistrates of popular nomination (i.e. tribunes, reformers, conservatories), retained real authority, lasting with a symbolic role until the 19th century.
- Shopping Center: the earliest example of public shopping mall was the Trajan's Market in Ancient Rome built around 100-110 AD by Apollodorus of Damascus.
- Sphygmomanometer (partially innovated): invented by the Austrian Samuel Siegfried Karl Ritter von Basch, Scipione Riva Rocci added to the design a key element: a cuff encircling the arm. Previous designs had used rubber bulbs filled with water or air to manually compress the artery or other technically complicated ways of pressure measurement.
- Staff: invented by music theorist Guido of Arezzo, whose four-line staff is still used today.
- Star fort (or Italian outline): with the first examples located in Italy, built towards the mid-15th century. The bastioned trace was originally developed by Italian architects (e.g. Francesco di Giorgio Martini, Giuliano Giamberti da Sangallo, Michelangelo Buonarroti), with experimentations of shapes continuing during the 16th century (see, for instance, castle of Copertino)
- Stiletto: a type of narrow dagger appearing in Italy during the Middle Ages.
- Stock Exchange (origins): the underlying principles of stock exchange were introduced by Italian merchants in Bruges (Belgium); an early example of stock exchange dates back to around 1309 in an inn called "Huis ter Beurze". The inn belonged to the Ter Bourse family, merchants of possible (if not likely) Venetian origin (della Borsa), who conducted transactions at the inn. The term 'beurs' derives from the name of this inn, spreading to other European countries and evolving into 'bourse', 'borsa', 'bolsa', 'börse', etc. In England the term 'bourse' was used between 1550 and 1775, eventually giving way to the term 'royal exchange'.

=== T ===
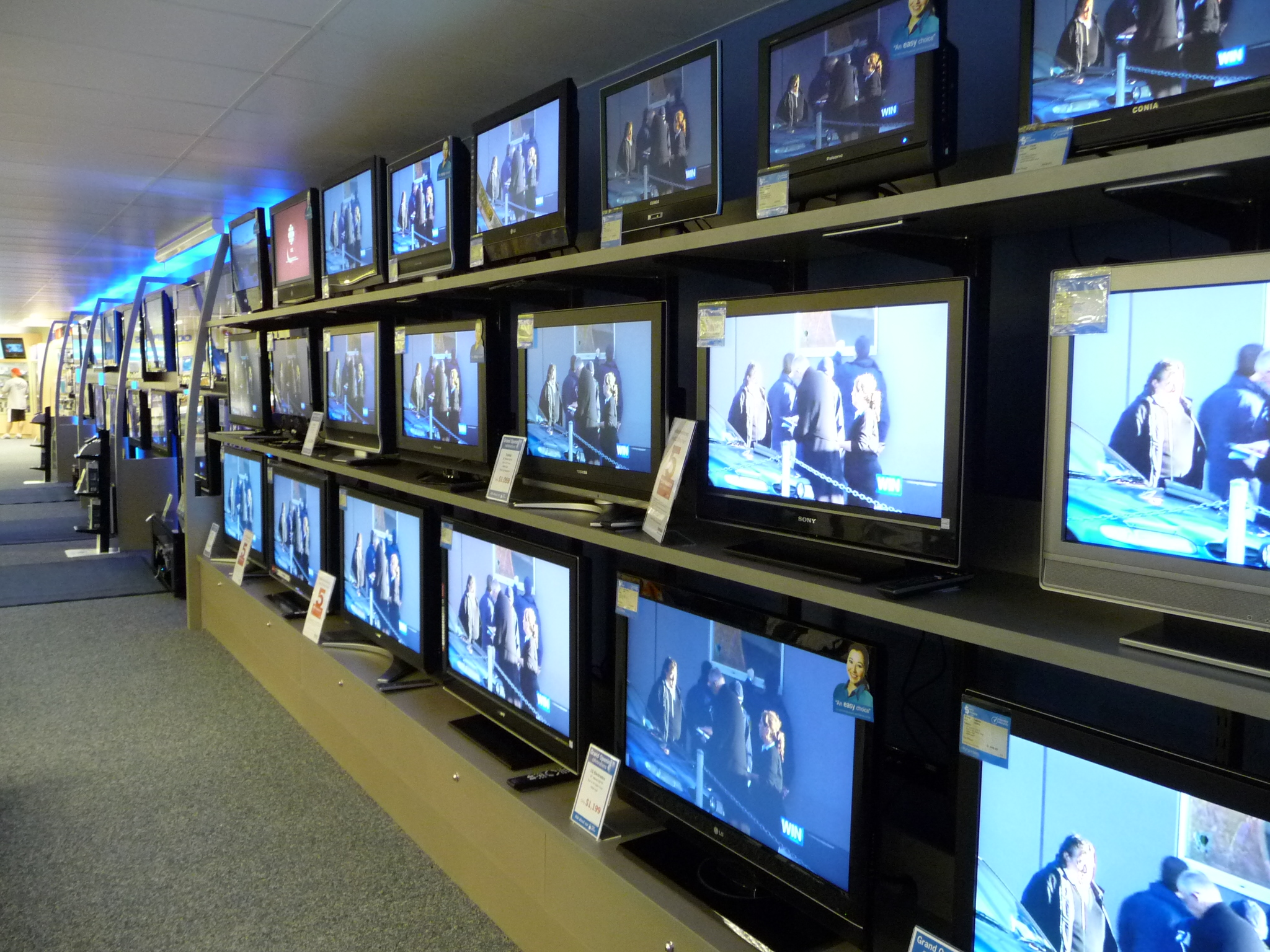
Television was invented by the Italian-American Augusto Bissiri.

- Modern enclosed Theater: Their structure was similar to that of ancient theaters, with a cavea and an architectural scenery, representing a city street. The oldest surviving examples of this style are the Teatro Olimpico in Vicenza (1580) and the Teatro all'antica in Sabbioneta (1590).
- Prepaid telephone card: the Italian phone company SIP (later becoming Telecom Italia) inaugurated the earliest pre-paid electronic phone cards in 1976, as a response to shortages of coin and theft of tokens and coins from public telephones. The invention of the phone card itself (soon after spread in Europe) dates 1975, introduced by the Italian SIDA and was initially used at a SIP public telephone center in Rome. Tim introduced the first prepaid sims in 1996.
- Automatic telephone exchange: the first one being built for the Vatican in 1886 by Giovanni Battista Marzi.
- Television (partially innovated): the Italian-American Augusto Bissiri was an early pioneer of the transmission of pictures, and is credited as an inventor of the television. His first short-distance transmission occurred in 1906, while his first intercontinental one dates 1917. In 1922 a system composed by disks, cathode-ray tube and screen is filed for patent; other improvements followed. Among other inventions, he developed a railway safety system and the Lettera Disco (lit. letter-disk), a voice recording device. In 1927 Philo Farnsworth performed the first transmission of a fully electronic image. Later, a legal battle broke out between him and V. Zworykin.
- Thermojet: an early type of motorjet (jet engine) developed by Secondo Campini, whose prototype Caproni Campini N.1 has been the first (successful) publicly demonstrated jet airplane. He applied the motor-jet to boats too. Despite being abandoned in favor of turbojets, Campini' s work has inspired other new propulsion approaches.
- Galileo thermometer: invented by Galileo Galilei in 1593.
- Toffoli gate: a universal reversible logic gate invented by Tommaso Toffoli.
- Public toilets: latrines were part of the sanitation system of ancient Rome, placed near or as part of public baths (thermae). During the Middle Ages sanitation partially regressed, to be reintroduced in Europe by Britain (WC or water-closet) and France.
- Tarot: Tarot, any of a set of cards used in tarot games and in fortune-telling. Tarot decks were invented in Italy in the 1430s by adding to the existing four-suited pack a fifth suit of 21 specially illustrated cards called trionfi ("triumphs") and an odd card called il matto ("the fool").
- Tarot card reading: One of the earliest reference to tarot triumphs is given c. 1450–1470 by a Dominican preacher in a sermon against dice, playing cards and 'triumphs'. References to the tarot as a social plague continue throughout the 16th and 17th centuries, but there are no indications that the cards were used for anything but games anywhere. As philosopher and tarot historian Sir Michael Dummett noted, "it was only in the 1780s, when the practice of fortune-telling with regular playing cards had been well established for at least two decades, that anyone began to use the tarot pack for cartomancy."
- Tontine: a form of life insurance developed by Lorenzo De Tonti in 1653.
- Torpedo: invented by the Italian G. B. Luppis and perfected by the English R. Whitehead.
- Touchpad (co-invented): Federico Faggin has been co-founder and CEO of Synaptics. He co-invented many patents assigned to Synaptics, which produced and commercialized the first touch-pad and the earliest touchscreens. In an interview, Faggin stated that Apple had been the first company to be truly interested on Synaptics' touchscreens, asking for the exclusive on the technology. The offer was declined; nonetheless the later success of iPhones and iPads opened a huge market for Synaptics.
- Trimprob: used for the electromagnetic detection of cancerous tissue, was developed in 1992 by Italian engineer Clarbruno Vedruccio.
- Triumphal Arch: the first recorded triumphal arches were set up in the time of the Roman Republic.
- Typewriter: in 1575 the venetian printer and bookseller Francesco Rampazetto created the first prototype of a machine that could impress letters on a piece of paper by means of "tactile writing". In 1714 the English engineer Henry Mill patented a typewriter without fabricating it. Early versions of the typewriter are reported in Austria in 1779 and Italy just after 1800 by Pellegrino Turri and Pietro Conti di Cilavegna. In 1855 Novara lawyer Giuseppe Ravizza built and patented the Cembalo scrivano or macchina da scrivere a tasti (lit. "key based typing machine"), modeling its keyboard design on the keys of pianoforte. The Cembalo Scrivano is recognized as the most advanced typing machine until the invention of Remington. Cembalo scrivano was also capable of printing upper and lower cases that didn't exist yet in the first Remington typewriter machine.
  - electronic typewriter: Olivetti ET 101 is the first Olivetti e. t. (1978) and is the first global-scale produced electronic typewriter.
- Tuscan order: Classical order developed by the Romans.

=== U ===
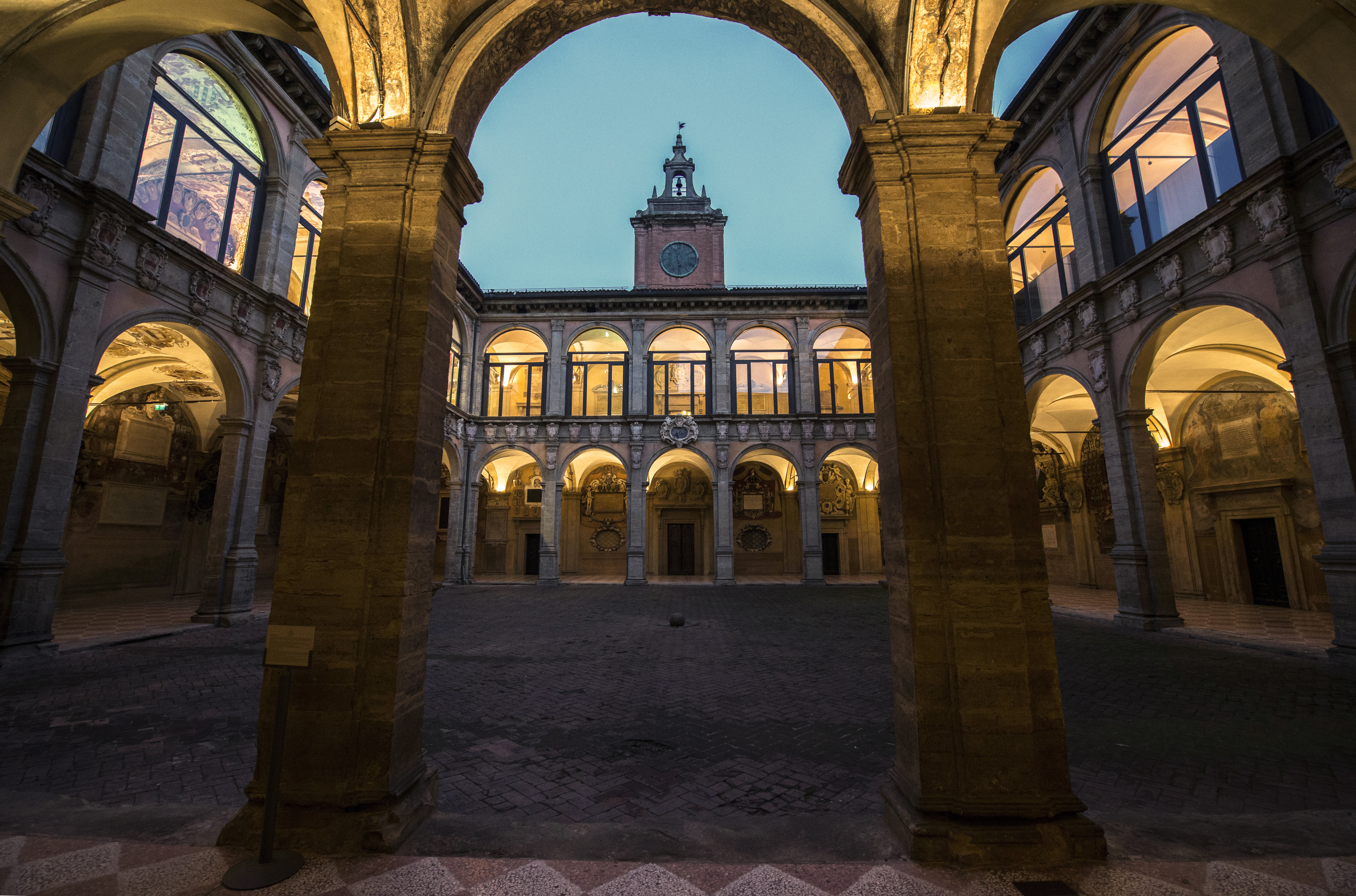
Bologna University, established in 1088 AD, is the world's oldest university in continuous operation.

- Unibody of Lancia Lambda, a car designed by Vincenzo Lancia and presented between 1921-'22. The vehicle introduced the fusion between chassis and bodywork, halving the weight compared to similar displacement cars and providing much higher resistance to impact in respect to traditional structures. Other new features included independent front suspension, allowing better safety, and a V-shaped overhead four cylinder engine.
- University: the term comes from the Latin "universus", meaning "the whole / the universe", indicating a community of masters and scholars focused on higher learning concerning all - both secular and religious - human knowledge known to that date, namely Jurisprudence, Medicine, Philosophy and Theology. European academics attending the universities were expected to have already mastered the seven liberal arts, spanning from grammar to music and astronomy. The University of Bologna (founded around 1088 AD) is, by these standards, the first university of the world and, as its motto goes, 'Nourishing Mother of the Studies'. Many other universities started flourishing in Italy from the 13th century onward. Previous higher educational institutions existed in the Byzantine Empire (chief among them the University of Constantinople in 425 AD) and during the Islamic Golden Age (the first one being the University of Karueein in 859 AD), focusing mainly on Islam (religion and laws) and only later obtaining the status of Universities. European universities themselves have, in part, religious origins, rooted in medieval Christian monastic schools and other institutions teaching theology. Finally, academies developed well before the Roman empire, with the most famous being depicted almost two millenniums later by Raphael: the school of Athens. Medieval universities are distinguished from the academies of the classical age by the particular legal recognition (i.e. degree) they granted to those who completed the studies.

=== V ===
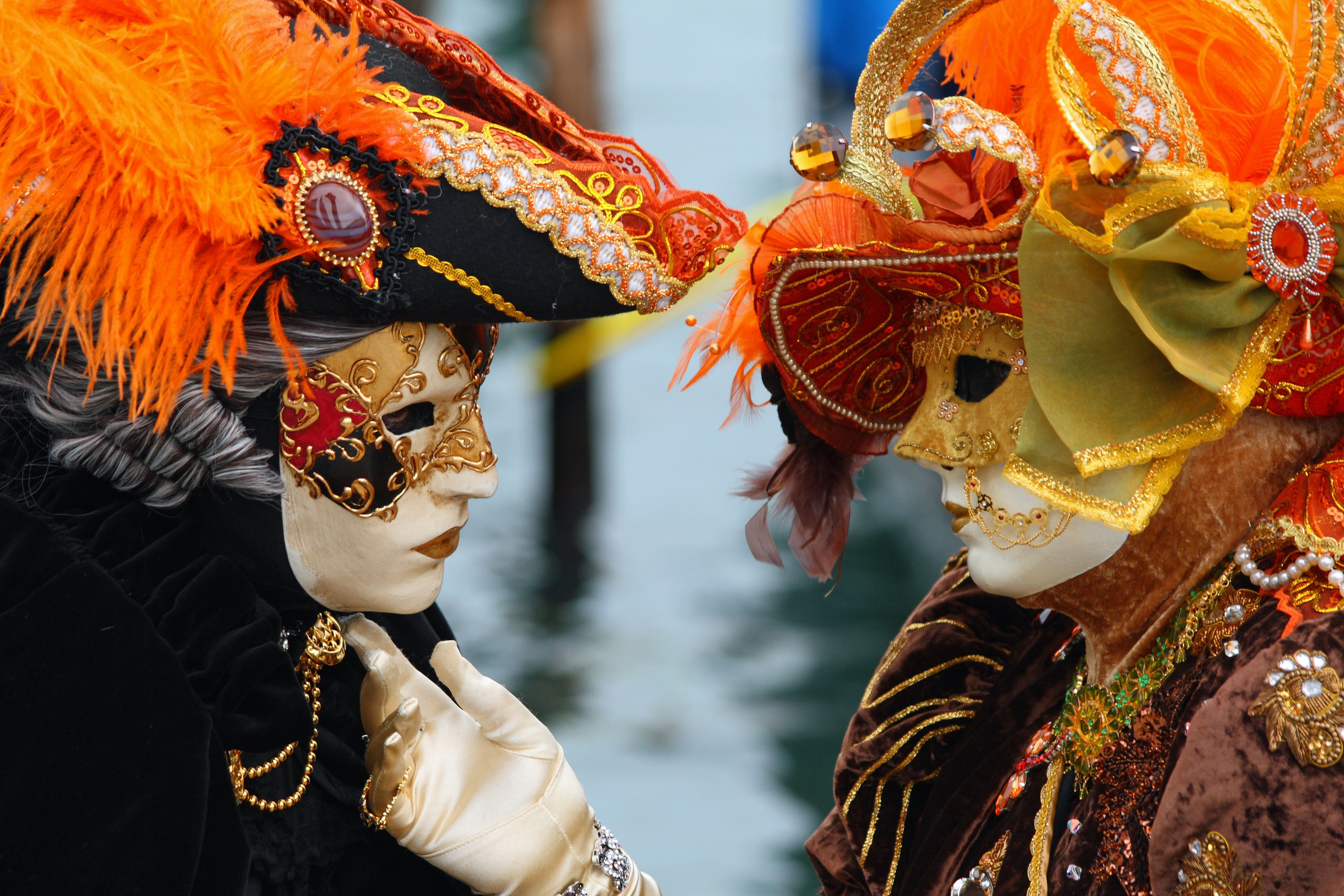
Venetian Carnival is an early example annual Carnival festival dating back in Venice to at least 1268. The most peculiar feature of Venice's celebration has laid in the extensive use of masks.

- Valsalva maneuver: named after its inventor, the 17th century physician Antonio Maria Valsalva, who firstly created it for testing of circulatory functions.
- Vault (partially innovated): the firsts vaults were either built underground or required continuous walls of great thickness to resist their thrust. Romans perfected the statics of the intersecting barrel vault, overcoming these limitations and pioneering the use of vaults over halls of great dimensions.
- Vega (rocket): Italy had the lead in this program (65%), which produced an extremely fast vector to bring light payloads into orbit. First Launch was in 2012.
- Venetian Carnival: carnival is an annual festival held in different places around the world, with an early example dating back in Venice to at least 1268. The most peculiar feature of Venice's celebration has laid in the extensive use of masks. The rite of Carneval has obscure origins, possibly Roman.
- Vespa: in 1946 the Italian vehicle manufacturer Piaggio patented a "motorcycle of a rational complexity of organs and elements combined with a frame with mudguards and a casing covering the whole mechanical part". This design became one of the most popular scooters worldwide and is still in production. The Vespa had an inedited load-bearing bodywork.
- Vibram: Vitale Bramani is credited with inventing the first rubber lug soles for shoes in 1937.
- Vibram FiveFingers: a type of shoe invented in 1999 by Robert Fliri.
- Viola (partially innovated): slightly larger than violin, is characterized by lower and deeper sound. Known fabrication started in northern Italy between 1530 and 1550. It is speculated that the 'Viola da gamba' was invented in Valencia, Spain, to be later introduced in Italy during Renaissance: a valencian painting representing a viola dates back to 1475. However, the viola is the oldest arched instrument, dating back, in different forms, to at least the 9th century. Ascribing the true origin of this instrument to specific geographical locations leads to questionable results.

=== W ===
- Watermark: this medieval innovation was first introduced in Fabriano, Italy, in 1282.
- Welfare: the earliest form of welfare was the lex frumentaria instituted by the tribune Gaius Gracchus dating back to 122 B.C., a law that ordered Rome's government to supply its citizens with allotments of cheaply priced grain.
- Galileo Hydrostatic Weighing Scale: a weight measuring device that uses hydraulic counter-force of a liquid, usually water or oil, to determine weight of an object under Archimedes' principle. Nowadays is mainly used in hydraulic types of weighbridges. Its functioning principles were first described by Galileo Galilei in 1586.

=== Z ===
- Zamboni pile: early electric battery
- Ziegler–Natta catalyst: catalyst to produce polymers co-invented by Giulio Natta.

== Medical discoveries and techniques ==
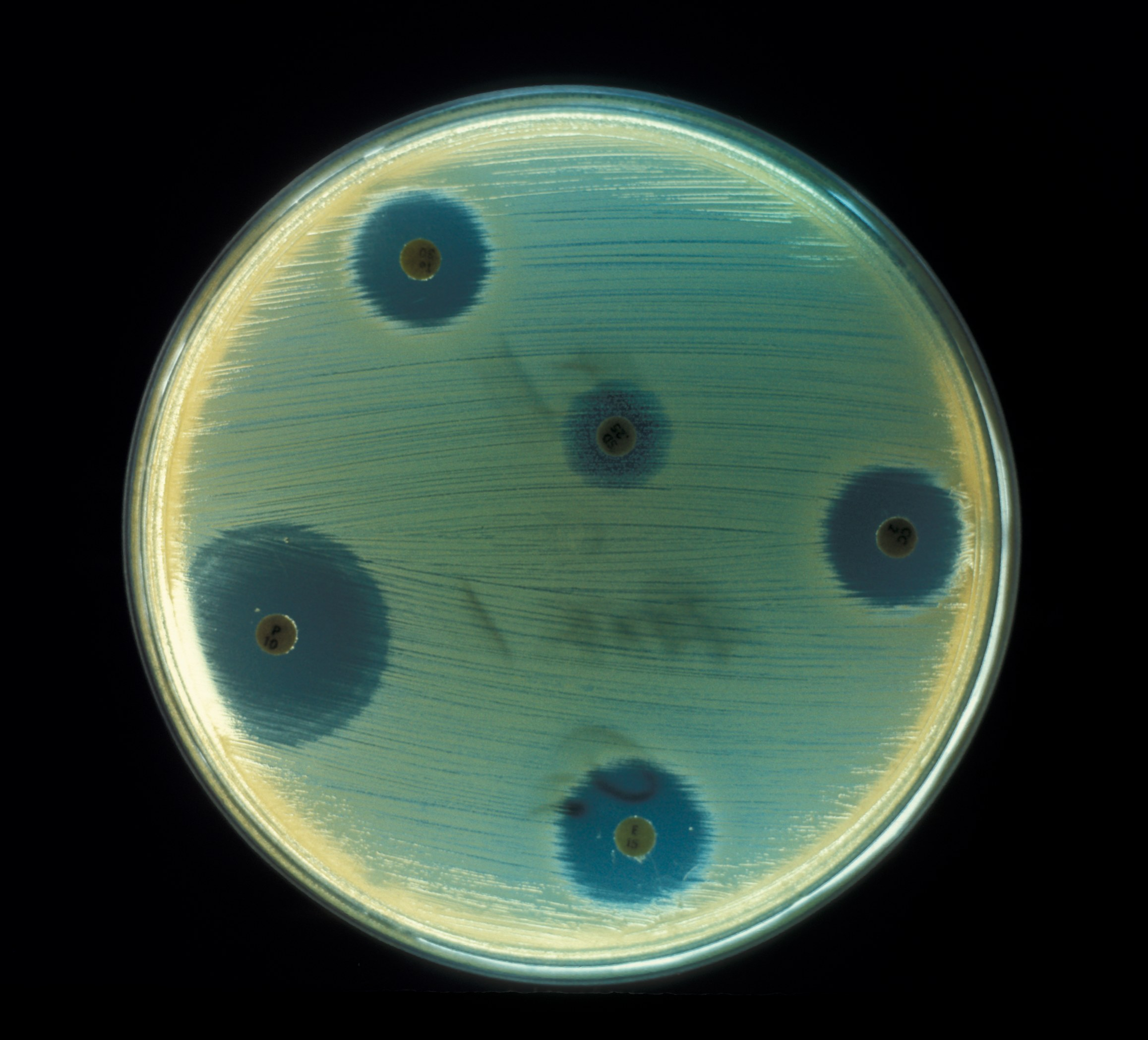
Antibiotics: Vincenzo Tiberio is considered by notable sources to be discoverer of antibiotics

- Antibiotics: Vincenzo Tiberio is considered by notable sources to be discoverer of antibiotics. By 1895 the Italian physician had already observed, scientifically reproduced and written a research on the antibiotic effect of "cellular products, soluble in water" extracted from Penicillium glaucum, Mucor mucedo and Aspergillus flavescens and sterilized in the experimentation (both in vitro and in vivo). It can't be ruled out the possibility of his findings to have been taken as a starting point for later European researches.
  - Mycophenolic acid, the first fungi-derived crystallized antitumour antibiotic, discovered by Bartolomeo Gosio, who is also known for his research on the toxic organometallic substance "Gosio gas".
  - Rifampicin, an antibacterial drug discovered by a team led by Prof. Piero Sensi at Lepetit Pharmaceuticals in 1957 in Milan, Italy.
  - Cephalosporins, Discovered by Giuseppe Brotzu in 1948.
- Artificial insemination: although previously theorized, only in 1784 the first artificial insemination in a viviparous animal was officially performed and reported by the Italian physiologist Lazzaro Spallanzani.
- Black reaction: a silver staining technique which was first performed by Camillo Golgi. It helped the study of the nerve cells.
- Blood circulation: since Galen times it was believed that the internal human body circulation was separated in two different circuits: veins system, carrying food to the body, and arteries system, responsible for the flowing pneuma or "circulating air" in the body that was necessary to vital functions. Although many beliefs of Galen have been disproved by many Italian anatomists during Renaissance, the first who guessed blood did not mix in the heart and, instead, formed a single circulating system passing through the lungs, was the Spanish physician Miguel Serveto. However, his works were largely unknown for a long time as he was burned at the stake with his books for heresy by order of the city's governing council of Geneva, and it was an Italian anatomy professor, Realdo Colombo, who validated the intuitions of Servetus, proving that cardiac septum is impermeable to blood. He also spoke correctly about the existence of pulmonary circulation. Girolamo Fabrizi d'Acquapendente (1537–1619) was the first to study the valves of the veins, but it was Andrea Cesalpino the one who described the circulation of blood in the body. Cesalpino showed that the heart, not the liver, is the engine that physically pumps the blood into the vessels: starting from the arteries to capillaries, blood reaches the whole body, then it returns through the veins up to the heart. He used for the first time the term blood circulation and he demonstrated that in veins and arteries flows only blood, not pneuma, and that the passage of blood from arteries to veins through capillaries is due to difference of pressure. It remains famous his experiment of ligature of veins then resumed by William Harvey in order to prove the blood flow course in veins. Finally, Marcello Malpighi gave with his microscope observational proof of the exchange of blood from arteries to veins in capillaries.
- Cerebrospinal fluid: the physician Domenico Cotugno is credited with the discovery of this fluid in 1774.
- DDrna: a class of small non-coding RNAs (abbreviated DDRNAs) unveiled in a study by Fabrizio d'Adda di Fagagna, which play an important role in the activation of DDR, and in turn, as previously discovered by F. Fagagna, in the proliferation's inhibition typical of cellular aging.
- Gastric digestion (scientific proof): Edward Stevens for the first time performed an in vitro digestion. Spallanzani interpreted the process of digestion not simply as a mechanical process, but as one of actual solution, chemically mediated by the acid gastric juice of the stomach.
- Eustachian tube: Bartolomeo Eustachi extended the knowledge of the internal ear by rediscovering and describing correctly the tube that bears his name. He is the first who described the internal and anterior muscles of the malleus and the stapedius, and the complicated figure of the cochlea.
- Fallopian tube: Gabriele Falloppio studied the reproductive organs in both sexes, and described the tube, which leads from the ovary to the uterus and now bears his name. He was the first to describe a condom (in his writings, a linen sheath wrapped around the penis), and he advocated the use of such sheaths to prevent syphilis.
- Germ theory of disease (as a scientific theory): physician Girolamo Fracastoro, scholar and poet, in 1546 was the first proposing that epidemic diseases are caused by transferable tiny particles or "spores" that could transmit infection by direct or indirect contact or even without contact over long distances. In his idea the "spores" of diseases may refer to either chemicals or living entities. He appears to have first used the Latin word fomes, meaning tinder, in the sense of infectious agent. He was the one to christen the syphilis disease with this name, from the name of a young boy Syphilius in Greek mythology, who was punished with an horrible disease for he had offended Apollo. Fracastoro also gave the first scientific description of typhus. The lunar crater Fracastorius is named after him.

Golgi apparatus: an organelle of the eukaryotic cell, discovered by Camillo Golgi in 1897.

- Golgi apparatus: an organelle of the eukaryotic cell, discovered by Camillo Golgi in 1897.
- HIV Virus (co-discovered): the French Luc Montagnier and the Italian American Robert Charles Gallo (US-born) are credited with discovering the virus causing the acquired immunodeficiency syndrome (AIDS).
- Human Genome Diversity Project (or HGDP): a research project started by Stanford University's Morrison Institute in 1990s along with collaboration of scientists around the world. It has been the result of many years of work by Luigi Cavalli-Sforza.
- Insulin: artificial synthesis (contribution in discovery): the Italian Roberto Crea was part of a team of ten Genentech scientists publishing in 1979 a research that described the solution for synthetic insulin, obtained through genes (coding the protein insulin A and B) that were inserted in Escherichia coli bacteria. This technique made possible the mass production of insulin without relying on extraction from animals sources.
- Liposuction: medical procedure invented by Dr Giorgio Fischer in 1974.
- Malaria transmission: discovered by Amico Bignami to be originated by mosquitoes as infecting vectors.
- Mirror Neurons: being activated in a subject following either his own actions or the ones of another observed actor. These kinds of neurons were discovered by a team of Italian scientists led by Giacomo Rizzolatti.
- MS4A4A: discovered by an Italian research, this molecule plays a central role in the dialogue between Natural Killer and macrophage cells, controlling the tumoral metastatic diffusion.
- NGF or nerve growth factor: a protein involved primarily in the growth, as well as the maintenance, proliferation, and survival of nerve cells, whose absence leads to various diseases. Co-discovered in the early 1950s by Rita Levi-Montalcini in collaboration with Stanley Cohen. Today, NGF and its relatives are collectively designated as neurotrophins and are extensively studied for their role in mediating multiple biological phenomena.
- Octopamine: discovered by Vittorio Erspamer.
- Oncovirus: type of virus capable of causing cancers. The experiments led by Italian-American Renato Dulbecco and his group demonstrated that the genes of the reverse transcribing viruses infecting the cells, are inoculated into their chromosomes, with a behavior that alternates phases of inactivity and activity, linked to the formation of tumors. Nobel prize was awarded to Renato Dulbecco, David Baltimore and Howard Temin. In 1986 R. Dulbecco proposed the Human Genome Project to the international community, with the subsequent project initiation by the Italian CNR (National Research Council).
- Occupational medicine: with his book on occupational diseases, De Morbis Artificum Diatriba (Diseases of Workers), Bernardino Ramazzini played a substantial role in the birth and development of Occupational medicine, outlining the health hazards of chemicals, dust, metals, repetitive or violent motions, odd postures, and other disease-causative agents encountered by workers in more than fifty occupations.
- Piezoelectric surgery: a surgery technique developed by Tomaso Vercellotti.
- Pneumothorax induction as an early method of treating tuberculosis: nowadays abandoned, proposed by Carlo Forlanini.
- Ricordi Chamber: doctor Camillo Ricordi -director of Diabetes Research Center (DRI), and Cell Transplant Center of University of Miami- became one of highest authorities in the cure of diabetes disease; he developed the first device able to isolate large quantities of insulin-producing cells from the human pancreas and to have successfully conducted the first series of pancreatic islets transplants capable of treating diabetes. His procedures have been used worldwide.
- Robotic Hand Prosthesis (permanent implant on humans): the first prototype of an artificial, poly-articulated and sensitive hand was made in Italy, with a real-time decoding of the electrical signals sent from the brain to the muscles.
- Romano-Ward syndrome: Independently described by Cesarino Romano in 1963 and by Irish paediatrician Owen Conor Ward in 1964, the Romano-Ward syndrome is an autosomal dominant long-term QT syndrome, also known as congenital (autosomal dominant) long QT syndrome (LQTS). Unlike Jervell-Lange-Nielsen syndrome, there is no congenital hearing loss present. Multiple genetic mutations identified linked to cardiac potassium and beta-adrenergic channels.
- Sarcoptes scabiei: discovered by Giacinto Cestoni and Giovanni Cosimo Bonomo (in 1687) and identified as the disease-causing agent of scabies. Bonomo also developed the cure: bathing in antiseptic. Parasitology had other fundamental advancements thanks to the research of Francesco Redi, pioneering the subsequent invalidation of spontaneous generation.
- SARS virus: an infectious disease discovered by Carlo Urbani; having been infected, he didn't live long enough to see how effective his early detection and intervention was in buying time and saving lives.

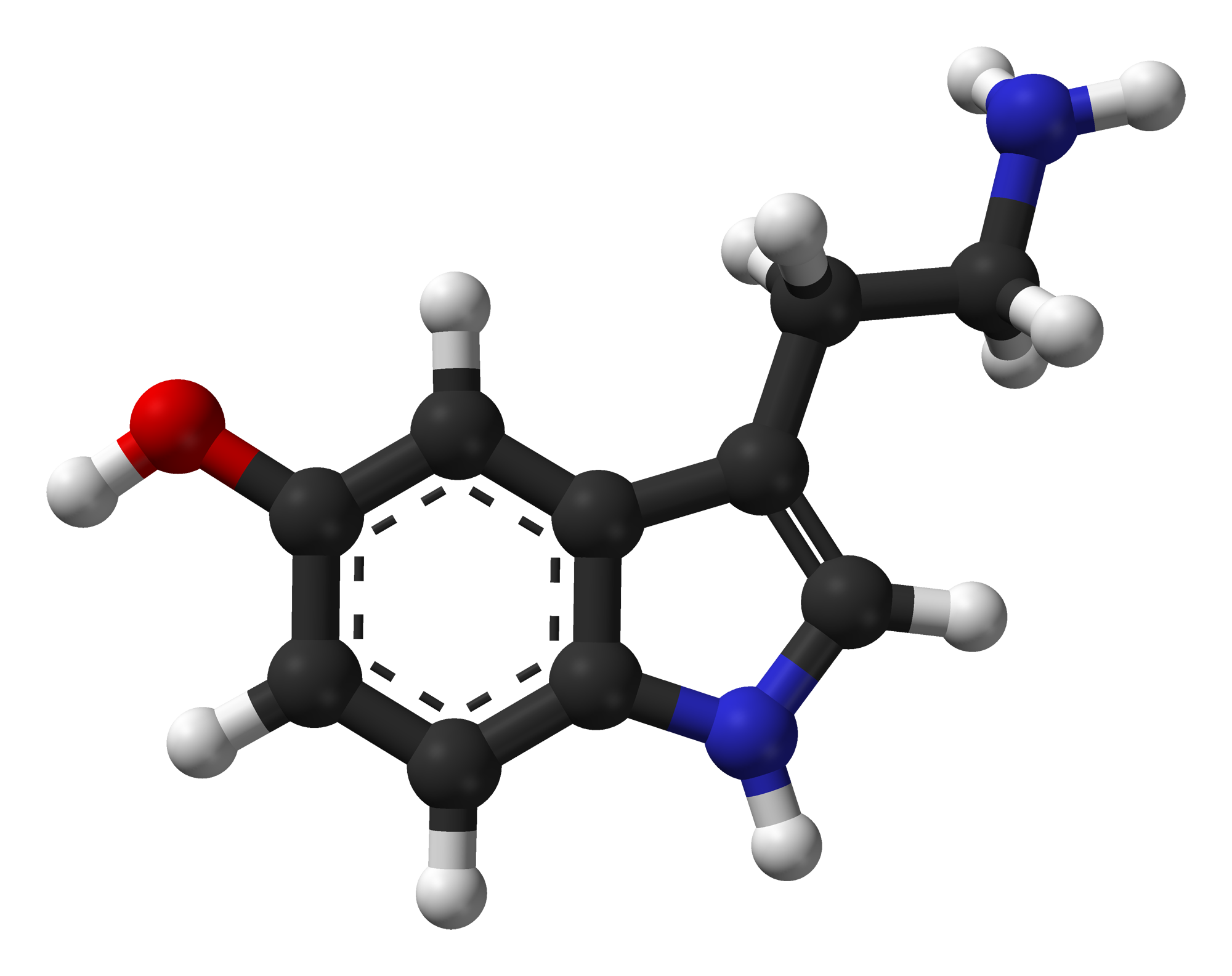
Serotonin: discovered and synthesized by Italian chemist and pharmacologist Vittorio Erspamer.

- Serotonin: discovered and synthesized by Italian chemist and pharmacologist Vittorio Erspamer.
- (Spinal) biomechanics: Giovanni A. Borelli is often considered father of biomechanics, having calculated the forces necessary in the human body for reaching the equilibrium in the joints, long before the publishing of the Newtonian Laws. Borelli first understood that it is the motion to be magnified by the locomotor system's levers rather than force and consequently motion-producing muscles have to explicate greater force compared to the motion-resisting entities. It is worth mentioning Borelli ideated what is probably the first rebreather.
- Stem cells as vectors for Gene Therapy: in 1992 doctor Claudio Bordignon, working at the Vita-Salute San Raffaele University in Milan, performed the first procedure of gene therapy using hematopoietic stem cells as vectors delivering genes intended to correct hereditary diseases. He is known for having validated many successful gene therapy protocols targeting genetic and acquired disorders, such as leukaemias.
- Striated muscles: first differentiated from smooth muscles by Giorgio Baglivi in his monograph De fibra motrice. An exponent of iatrophysics, he isolated muscle fibers and studied them using a compound microscope, outlining the fundamental role played by the fiber as a structure. He also concluded that the heart muscle had spontaneous contraction, independent from other innervations. His depiction of pulmonary edema is credited as its first proper clinical description. In addition, he proposed the introduction of specialized medical degrees.
- Strimvelis: the first ex-vivo stem cell gene therapy to treat patients with a very rare disease called ADA-SCID. The treatment was developed at San Raffaele Telethon Institute for Gene Therapy (SR-Tiget), in Milan. Strimvelis has been approved in Europe for the treatment of human patients.
- Tafazzin: a protein discovered in 1996 by Italian scientists Silvia Bione, researcher at the time at the Institute of Genetics, Biochemistry and Evolution-CNR of Pavia.
- Transcranial direct-current stimulation (tDCS), with the first recorded clinical application by Giovanni Aldini in 1803.
- Rappuoli (innovated) vaccines: covering more than 150 patent families that have been registered since the mid-1990s by Rino Rappuoli, radically changing the vaccine production procedures used to immunize millions of people.
  - Reverse vaccinology: a new method for making vaccines using the pathogen's sequenced genome, pioneered by R. Rappuoli and the J. Craig Venter Institute. Rappuoli has continued researching for even more advanced techniques.
  - Recombinant pertussis vaccine (1992): with genetic editing and inactivation of the toxic gene in the chromosome of Pertussis bacterium, so that a non-toxic molecule is produced instead. The immune response was reported to improve compared to previous conventional technologies.
- CAd3-ZEBOV: an experimental Ebola virus vaccine developed by Swiss-Italian biotechnology company Okairos under the leadership of Dr Riccardo Cortese, in collaboration with American Nih. Okairos was later incorporated into GlaxoSmithKline.
- Trotula: Trota De Ruggiero (or Trocta) was a medical practitioner, probably a regular physician and university Professor who lived in the early 12th century in Salerno, near Naples. It seems she was daughter of one of the private Professors of the Schola Medica Salernitana, following her father's steps as a physician and teacher of medicine, and whose progeny continued this tradition as well. It is uncertain whether she was the first woman of the Medieval age to become a graduated physician in the Western World, but it is well known from various sources that at least 24 women practiced surgery in Neapolitan Area during Middle Ages. Trota left a collection of writings about the cure of women illnesses in a codex named after her, Trotula. It consists of three manuscripts, of which only the book called De curis mulierum (lit. "On Treatments for Women") is attributed to her, while the other two are works of different authors. The fact she wrote such an organic collection of remedies and cures is one of the evidences suggesting she was a regular graduate and not a simple practitioner. The Schola Medica Salernitana is considered "the oldest medical school of modern civilization" and "forerunner of modern University Medical Schools".
- VEGF: Napoleone Ferrara isolated and cloned the 'vascular endothelial growth factor' in 1989, while working at Genentech. He is credited with developing a whole new class of anti-VEGF drugs for cancer treatment. He had a leading role in the development of ranibizumab, a drug intended for macular degeneration.

== Law, philosophy and humanities ==
- Baroque, firstly, as an architectural style developed in Rome, a result of doctrines adopted by the Catholic Church at the Council of Trent in 1545–63 in response to the Protestant Reformation; later, developing as an artistic, literary, and musical style.
- Colony, from the Latin "colonia", indicating a Roman outpost established to secure conquered territory (sometimes situated near previous settlements) and built for retired Roman legionaries. Colonies have been part of a Roman policy "whose wisdom only the future could fully reveal"-(Cedric A. Yeo, The Classical World). Eventually the term denoted the highest status of a Roman city. Many colonies survived the fall of Rome, with some becoming seminal European cities (e.g. London, Paris, Barcelona, Frankfurt). The map of Roman infrastructures manifests a remarkable pattern similarity with European road density today: ancient cities and roads might have set the template for the next two thousand years of economic development.
- Cosmology of Giordano Bruno: he expanded the relatively new Copernican theory proposing for the first time the idea that the stars were distant suns (as bodies emitting energy) surrounded by their own planets (as bodies receiving and reflecting energy) orbiting around. According to Steven Soter "[this] is arguably the greatest idea in the history of astronomy". Giordano raised the possibility that these planets might foster life of their own, a philosophical position known as cosmic pluralism; he also claimed the universe is infinite and could have no "center". Barely suffering any form of religious authority, he was excommunicated by three different Christian cults: Catholics, Lutherans and Calvinists. In his positions Bruno identified God as a God-Nature, as a reality that in itself subsists immanent in the guise of the Infinite, since infinity is the fundamental characteristic of the divine. For this reason and other beliefs considered heretic by the Catholic Church, such as negating Holy Trinity, he was dragged into court in Venice by local Inquisition, where he skillfully tried to defend himself stating that philosophers in their course of thoughts, according to "the natural light of intellect", can come to conflicting conclusions with the matters of faith, without having to be considered heretics. Roman Inquisition asked for his extradition to Rome, that was exceptionally granted by the Venetian Senate, and in Rome Bruno decided to not defend himself anymore and instead openly declare his beliefs. Found guilty of heresy, he was burned at the stake.
- Fermi paradox: arising from the high probability of existence of extraterrestrial civilizations and yet absence of alien contacts (given the great number of stars and planets of our galaxy and billions of years of time for hypothetical civilizations to develop space travel). Herbert York wrote in 1984 that Fermi "followed up with a series of calculations on the probability of earthlike planets, the probability of life given an earth, the probability of humans given life, the likely rise and duration of high technology, and so on. He concluded on the basis of such calculations that we ought to have been visited long ago and many times over".
- Criminology:
  - Classical theory: Cesare Beccaria is credited with starting the school of classical theory on crime in his fundamental work On Crimes and Punishments.
  - Positivist theory: founded by Raffaele Garofalo, Enrico Ferri and Cesare Lombroso, the latter being prominent in criminal anthropology.
- Fascism: illiberal political movement characterized as a form of far-right, authoritarian ultranationalism, created by politician and then dictator Benito Mussolini.

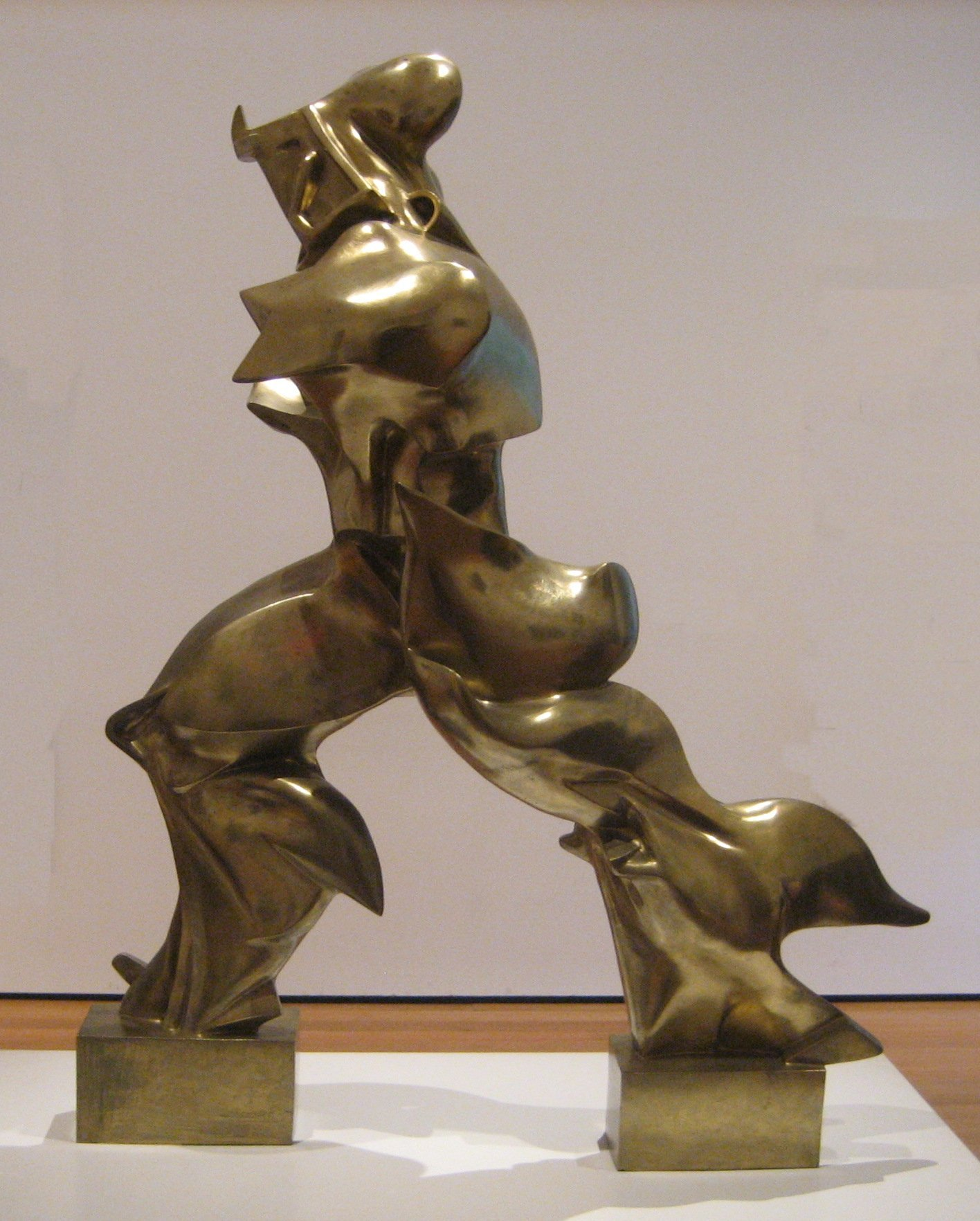
Futurism, an artistic and social movement, was born in Italy in the early 20th century

- Futurism: an artistic and social movement born in Italy in the early 20th century, that glorified modernity, emphasized speed, technology, youth, impetuosity, and iconic objects of modernity and speed such as internal combustion engines, the car and the airplane as a form of art, an ideal of beauty and trendy absolute ambition for manly boldness. Filippo Tommaso Marinetti was the most prominent figure of the movement.
- Humanism: a broad concept present in different cultures, derives its term from the Latin "humanitas", developed during Roman times (see Aulus Gellius).
- Latin alphabet, derived from the Greek alphabet; became the foundation of many languages worldwide, e.g. Neo-Latin languages. Currently more than 4.9 billion people rely on this alphabet.
- Machiavellianism: (or Machiavellism) is widely defined as the political philosophy of the Italian Renaissance diplomat Niccolò Machiavelli, usually associated with realism in foreign and domestic politics, and with the view that those who lead governments must prioritize the stability of the regime over ethical concerns. There is no scholarly consensus as to the precise nature of Machiavelli's philosophy, or what his intentions were with his works. The word Machiavellianism first appeared in the English language in 1607, due to Machiavelli's popularity, often as a byword for unsavory government politics.
- Renaissance humanism: a cultural movement of rebirth in the study of classical antiquity, originating in Italy and then spreading across Western Europe (around 1300–1500). Humanists perceived themselves as a different kind of men opposed to those who lived in medieval age and who had another vision of the world, science and literature, rougher and incomplete if compared to the humanistic rediscovery of ancient classics, new perception of nature of things, and a new way of conceiving arts and beauty.
- Roman Law: together with the Napoleonic Law, represents the foundation for the Civil Law, now adopted by 150 countries. Ancient Roman Law influenced to some extent the following medieval Common Law.
  - Adoption, as legal process of parenting another person and permanently transferring all rights and responsibilities, along with filiation and full rights for the adopted of inheriting family name and family legacies. Institution of adoption was widely used by Roman Emperors to grant themselves an heir of male gender.
  - Habeas Corpus's origins, which can be traced back to the Roman Law.
  - Marriage as a legal transaction between two peoples as stated by Roman law, sometimes involving the adoption of a prenuptial agreement.
  - Municipium, a social contract between municipes, the "duty holders," or citizens of the town: the munera were a communal obligation of the municipes in exchange for privileges and protections of citizenship. The continuation in the Middle Ages of municipal institutes of Roman derivation constituted, together with the feudal fragmentation and the mechanisms of association of bourgeois origin, one of the determining factors for the formation of the communes. They developed as autonomous and recognized forms of city government, of an economic nature and, particularly in Italy, political.
  - Proprietas: in ancient Roman legal system, indicates the sum of powers, rights and privileges, of a person on a thing. The seminal distinction between laws of property and obligation has characterized all Western Civilization. Historically, Democritus justified private property because it was efficient. Aristotle added the argument of human nature. Etruscans and Romans perceived private property as the bond of the family with the ancestors and gods.
- Runic alphabet: the runic alphabet was based on Old Italic script.
- Sonnet: type of poetry originating in Italy and highly developed by Francesco Petrarca.
- Scholasticism
  - (as a philosophy): a school of thought that employed a critical method of analysis and tried to reconcile the Christian faith with a system of rational thought (mainly derived from Greek philosophy), integrating classical philosophy as anticipating Christian theology. The intent of the scholastics was to develop a harmonious knowledge, integrating the Christian revelation with the philosophical systems of the Greek-Hellenistic world, as they were convinced of their compatibility, and to seek in the knowledge of the classics (mainly from great thinkers such as Socrates, Plato, Aristotle and Plotinus) a route able to raise the acceptance of Catholic dogmas. Scholasticism started developing from the works of the Roman Boethius at the very onset of the Middle Ages.
  - (as a method of organizing studies): an organization of higher education present in ancient schools and universities. Clergymen and secular literates usually started their cursus studiorum in capitular schools enclosed by abbeys and monasteries, learning the arts of Trivium (grammar, logic and rhetoric) and then proceeding in the arts of Quadrivium (arithmetic, geometry, music, and astronomy). King Lothair I of Italy, nephew of emperor Charlemagne, created a system of high schools in strategic cities of his reign (Pavia, Ivrea, Turin, Cremona, Florence, Fermo, Verona, Vicenza, Forlì) in order to train skilled officials and bureaucrats. Italian merchant cities enhanced the schooling system by creating, around 1100, the "Scuole d'Abaco" (abacus learning schools) as professional institutes intended for the preparation of accountants, clerks, and any sort of trading specialists.
- Theory of the two Suns: a political theory developed by Dante Alighieri, especially in the De Monarchia, advocating the autonomy of the temporal power of the Holy Roman Emperor from the spiritual power of the Pope. Dante has been defined by William Franke "pioneer and prophet of Christian Secularism".

== Math and physical sciences ==
=== Theories, Methods and Models ===
- Introduction of Indo-Arabic Numbers in Europe: Leonardo Fibonacci da Pisa (or Leonardo Pisano), arguably the most talented mathematician of Middle Ages, in his book Liber Abaci (1202) introduced the Arab numbers in the Western World, which was still relying on Roman numerals. He is also famous for the Fibonacci Sequence of numbers, as he used this sequence to calculate the growth of an ideal rabbit population in order to foresee its expansion. Sequence first mentions are from Indian mathematics. Much later, Lagrange will discover the Pisano periods of the sequence.
- Introduction of non-euclidean geometry in Europe: the first notable work investigating Euclid's Fifth Postulate was written by Persian Omar Khayyám in the 11th century. At the very end of the 17th century, the Italian Giovanni G. Saccheri resumed the concept of Khayyam–Saccheri quadrilateral in order to prove the fifth postulate, ultimately in vain. However, Saccheri became, quite unintentionally, discoverer and forerunner of non-euclidean geometries. In his demonstrative effort, he came to the description of the various properties of hyperbolic lines, subdividing the straight lines into three distinct classes: incident, asymptotic and ultraparallel. Furthermore, he outlined the fundamental concept of angle of parallelism. Later, fathers of hyperbolic geometry were Gauss, János Bolyai, and Lobachevsky.

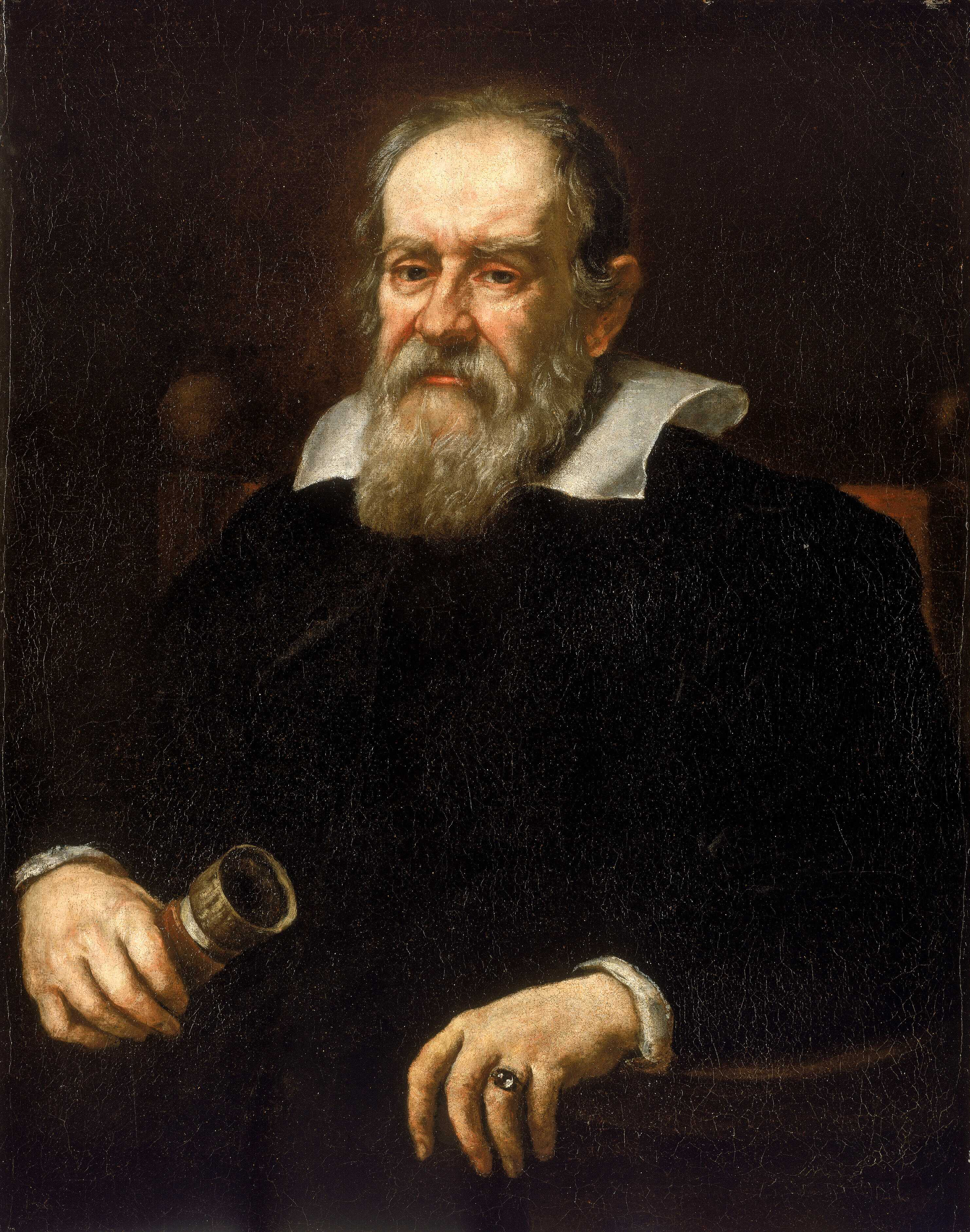
Scientific method (consisting of observation through quantification, hypothesis and testings of models): was theorized by Galileo Galilei, recognized as 'the father of modern science, physics and astronomy'.

- Scientific method (consisting of observation through quantification, hypothesis and testings of models): was theorized by Galileo Galilei, recognized as 'the father of modern science, physics and astronomy'. Galilei wanted to reach whatever conclusions a scrupulous and methodical analysis of evidence suggests rather than seeking exclusively the aspects of reality confirming and conforming to a specific orthodoxy. Galileo's method and discoveries represented the focal point for the European scientific revolution in the 17th century. He invalidated a belief system that parted the ancient world from modernity. Galileo revolutionized the goal of science: to research the mathematical properties of substances, such as 'location, motion, shape, size, opacity, mutability, generation and dissolution', instead of their intrinsic essence.
- Galilean relativity (the laws of physics are the same in every inertial frame): this seminal principle, defined by Galileo, was perfected and expanded during the following centuries. For example, Einstein's theory of special relativity states that the laws of physics are the same in any inertial frame, and, in particular, any measurement of the speed of light in any inertial frame will always be constant (around 300000 km/s).
- Law of inertia: a body having constant (k=0 v k>0) velocity, will retain its vector unless a force (f>0) acts upon it. Defined by Galileo for horizontal motion.
- Uniformly accelerated motion: correctly described for falling bodies from height h using an inclined plane by Galilei in d (distance) = k (constant)*t ^{2} (or d ∝ t ^{2}) , v (velocity) ∝ t , v ∝ h^{1/2}, with the specific mass of the bodies being irrelevant. Previously, William Heytesbury described the earliest mathematical relationship of motion with constant acceleration; with Nicole Oresme and Giovanni di Casali providing graphical demonstration of Heytesbury's statement.
- Isochronism of the pendulum: Galileo proposed this principle and illustrated a mechanical clock using the pendulum, with C. Huygens formulating the isochronism properly and credited as inventor of the pendulum clock. Controversy sparkled between Vincenzo Viviani and Huygens about the paternity of the invention.
- Italian school of algebraic geometry: being formed between 1891 and 1912, especially thanks to Corrado Segre, the school grouped several brilliant students and academics. C. Segre works focused mainly on algebraic geometry, being known for Segre classification, Segre cubic, Segre embedding, Segre surface, Zeuthen–Segre invariant (first discovered by Zeuthen). Other notable exponents of this school have been F. Enriques, F. Severi, G. Castelnuovo and G. Veronese; to these shall not be omitted the Polish mathematician O. Zariski. The school was composed by mathematicians interested in converging topics, who gave pivotal contributions to the development of the algebraic-geometric field particularly in the classification of algebraic surfaces, proceeding from the previous works of Alexander von Brill, M. Noether and Luigi Cremona.
- Algebra (from Arab al jabr): works such as Algebra by Raffaele Bombelli, 'Ars Magna' by Gerolamo Cardano and 'General trattato di numeri et misure' by Niccolò Tartaglia pioneered a systematic diffusion in didactic form of mathematical knowledge, introducing, for instance, the solution of third degree equations, imaginary numbers and operations within the set of complex numbers. Indian Brahmagupta had already solved 2nd degree equations.
- Ballistics: the discipline of ballistics was initially studied and developed by Italian mathematician Niccolo Tartaglia
- Ruffini's rule: a practical method developed by Paolo Ruffini allowing the factorization of polynomials (without degree limitation) as products of binomials, provided they meet particular conditions defined by the Ruffini's theorem.
- Mathematical analysis: Evangelista Torricelli's work in geometry and Cavalieri's principle, using the method of indivisibles and infinitesimals, paved the way for integral calculus (e.g. Bonaventura Cavalieri solved $\textstyle \int_{0}^{a} \displaystyle x^n$), which was later predominantly developed by Isaac Newton and Gottfried Wilhelm Leibniz. This method allowed the two Italian mathematicians to obtain simply and rapidly the area and volume of several geometric figures, including solids of revolution. Torricelli expanded Cavalieri's method to include curved indivisibles: the improvement consisted in the confrontation between two planar figures broken down using, respectively, rectilinear indivisibles for one and curved indivisibles (i.e. curves of infinitesimal thickness) for the other. If each curved indivisible has the same extension of the associated rectilinear indivisible then the areas of the two figures are equal. More dramatically, studying the curve describing distance as a function of time, Torricelli understood the concept of instant velocity as the tangent of a point on the curve forming an angle with the x axis. He intuited derivatives and, implicitly, the inverse character of integration and derivation. The fundamental theorem of calculus was explicitly enunciated by Isaac Barrow (thus called T.-Barrow theorem). Barrow himself mentioned Galileo, Cavalieri, and Torricelli. Eventually, the theorem received formal demonstration by Isaac Newton.
- Torricelli's trumpet: E.Torricelli researched the apparently contradicting properties (at least for his time) of a solid of revolution with finite volume (calculated by Torricelli to be π/a, with a value of abscissa) and yet infinite surface, obtained when the curve y=1/x for x=1 v x>1 is rotated in 3-space about the x-axis. In recognition for his works on infinitesimal geometry he was referred to as 'the highest geometer', in the century when Descartes, Cavalieri, Fermat and Huygens lived too. He calculated the coordinates of the center of gravity of geometric figures through the quotient of two definite integrals, developing a "universal theorem" nowadays still considered the most general possible. He introduced the curved indivisibles, that is the integration by substitution and the use of curvilinear coordinates, and, along with Fermat, worked towards the generalization of the Cavalieri's quadrature formula (solving the case of higher hyperbolae). Among other things, Torricelli calculated the volume of solids formed by any lateral surface and limited by two plane surfaces (e.g.: the volume of barrels). He also solved the Torricelli–Fermat point, worked with Roberval on the cycloid (its quadrature, center of gravity, and rotational solid), and researched the ballistic trajectories.
- Logarithmic spiral: was conceived and graphically rectified by Torricelli, up to its center, to which the curve tends after infinite revolutions. Torricelli substituted the "potential infinite and infinitesimal" of the Greeks with the "actual infinite and infinitesimal".
- Fano resonance: discovered by Italian physicist Ettore Majorana, and named after Italian-American Ugo Fano, who produced a theoretical explanation of the phenomenon. U. Fano is also known for Feshbach–Fano partitioning, Fano factor, Fano noise, Lu–Fano plot, Fano effect, Fano–Lichten mechanism, Beutler-Fano profile and Fano's theorem.
- Fubini's theorem: a result defining the conditions under which is possible to calculate a double integral by using iterated integral, described by Guido Fubini. He is also known for developing the Fubini-Study metrics in 1904, with Eduard Study describing the same just one year later, in 1905. Fubini opened new paths in the areas of analysis, geometry and mathematical physics.
- Functional analysis: Vito Volterra is considered founder of this branch of mathematics. He developed a general theory of functionals, i.e. functions of functions, not to be confused with function composition, and his works are credited with having a generous influence on modern calculus (e.g. harmonic integrals). Volterra also applied his analytics to the theories of elasticity, distortion and electromagnetism. He independently co-developed the predator-prey model.

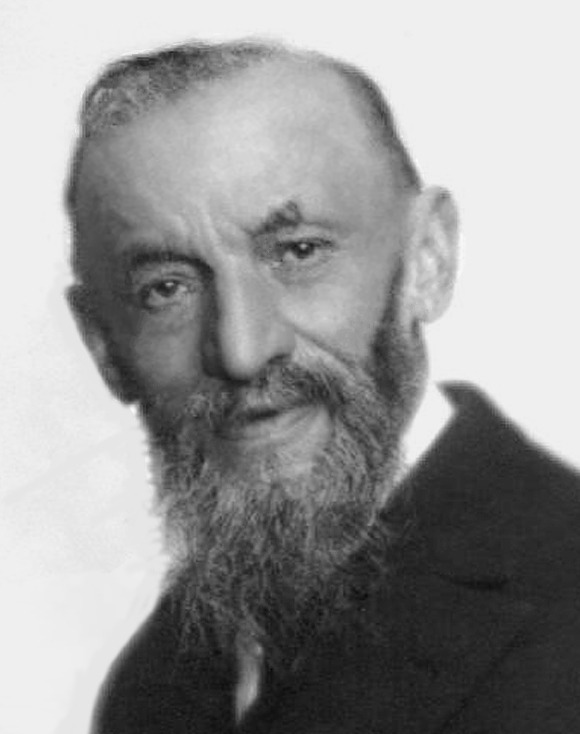
Peano axioms, defining the arithmetical properties for the set of natural numbers N; these postulates were proposed by Giuseppe Peano, a founder of mathematical logic and set theory

- Peano axioms, defining the arithmetical properties for the set of natural numbers N; these postulates were proposed by Giuseppe Peano, a founder of mathematical logic and set theory. He wrote Arithmetices principia, nova methodo exposita; common mathematical symbols have been introduced by or are derived from his work, such as ∈, ⊂, ∩, ∪, and A−B. He is also known for having developed the Peano curve, the Peano existence theorem, the Peano-Jordan measure, the Peano kernel theorem, the Peano–Russell notation and the Peano form of the remainder for the Taylor's theorem. His contributions spanned from geometry, mathematical analysis and vector calculus to logic and the indagation of principles.
- Probability calculus: initiated in Europe by Italian mathematicians, statistics and probability met general and systematic theorization with Pascal and Fermat. Cardano, for instance, enunciated what is possibly the first definition of classical probability. Permutation and combination had already been used by Arab mathematicians.
- Tensor calculus: extension of vector calculus to tensor fields, allowing expression of physics equations in a form that is independent of the choice of coordinates on a manifold, such as space-time. It was developed by Gregorio Ricci-Curbastro and Tullio Levi-Civita. Later, it constituted a critical tool used by Albert Einstein to develop his theory of relativity.
- Classical and celestial mechanics: Giuseppe Luigi Lagrangia improved the Newtonian mechanics formulating what is known as Lagrangian mechanics, introducing the concepts of generalized coordinates, potential (i.e. gravitational or electrical field) and Lagrangian orbits.
- Group theory: Lagrange's theorem of groups (a subgroup's order must always divide the order of the group exactly) represents one of the earliest steps in the theory of groups. Lagrange is considered a founder of group theory, along with Niels Henrik Abel and Évariste Galois.
- Hydrodynamics
  - Winds (in scientific terms): explained by Torricelli as an atmospheric phenomenon consisting of movements of air masses "produced by differences of air temperature, and hence density, between two regions of the earth". He wrote "we live submerged at the bottom of an ocean of air".
  - Torricelli also described fluids with the Torricelli's law, a particular case of Bernoulli's principle; his work was so important that Ernst Mach considered T. "founder of hydrodynamics".
  - Venturi effect: fluid pressure is reduced when a fluid flows in a more constricted section of a pipe. Discovered by the Italian scientist Giovanni Battista Venturi.
- Avogadro principle: equal volumes of all (ideal) gases, at the same temperature and pressure, have the same number of particles (atoms or molecules).
- Law of Capacitance: Q (quantity of charge) = C (capacitance) * V (tension or voltage), discovered by Alessandro Volta (its proper formulation is: Q ∝ V).
- Mercalli scale, developed by volcanologist Giuseppe Mercalli, classifies the intensity of an earthquake based on its visible effects on buildings.
- Metallurgy (innovated): Pirotechnia by Vannoccio Biringuccio (1540) represents the first book (and the first printed) totally dedicated to metallurgy, elements and techniques. V. Biringuccio is regarded as "the first true foundryman and the father of the foundry industry". Prior to his publication, foundry techniques were kept as a secret and generally handed down orally: Pirotechnia is the starting point for a true technological literature, interested in experimental fact and method, of which Biringuccio is considered an important exponent (also see Bernardino Telesio and Francis Bacon).
- Milky Way (in scientific terms): Galileo observed, described and theorized our galaxy as a collection of a tremendous amount of stars.
- Paleontology: although mainly known for his artistic endeavors, Leonardo da Vinci was paleontology's founding father (also see Science of Leonardo da Vinci, about Leonardo's visionary research).
- Paleoceanography, Cesare Emiliani is considered founder of this field of science, having discovered that deep oceans are not immutable environments: they have oscillated considerably in temperature over geological ages.
- CKM Matrix: a unitary matrix containing information about the strength of the flavour-changing weak interaction. The first version of the matrix was developed in 1963 by Nicola Cabibbo -renowned physicist and later president of the Pontifical Academy of Science- and was subsequently completed by the Japanese Makoto Kobayashi and Toshihide Maskawa. Nobel Prize was awarded to the latter two omitting the former. Cabibbo's work helped in understanding the violation of an almost exact symmetry of charge and parity between particles and the corresponding antiparticles, called Cp violation. It is hypothesized matter and anti-matter to be present in equal quantities at the beginning of the universe. The violation could help explain why matter is now far more abundant than antimatter.
- Quantum loop theory: the Italian theoretical physicist and writer Carlo Rovelli is one of the founders of this quantum theory of gravity, together with Lee Smolin and Abhay Ashtekar. The theory is aimed at merging the general relativity with quantum mechanics. Furthermore, C. Rovelli and French mathematician Alain Connes put forward the thermal time hypothesis in order to solve the problem of time.
- Relational quantum mechanics: interpretation of the state of a quantum system as the relation between the observer and the system, introduced by C. Rovelli.
- Viterbi algorithm, developed by the Italian-American Andrea Viterbi, found useful applications in mobile phones.
- Gini Index: often used in economy and statistics to define, among the units of a community, the global measure of the inequality in income's distribution.
- Least absolute deviations: a statistical technique introduced by Serbian-Italian, Croatian and European scientist Ruggero Giuseppe Boscovich. His physical theories would influence Hamilton.

=== Particles ===
- Astatine (co-discovered, in US): Dale R. Corson, Kenneth Ross MacKenzie, and Emilio Segrè are credited with isolating the element in 1940.
- Methane, the simplest hydrocarbon, isolated and studied for its inflammable properties by Alessandro Volta. He also demonstrated interests in the ignition of other inflammable gases through electric sparks, designing a rudimentary electric pistol.
- Technetium (Tc): in 1937 two Italian scientists - Carlo Perrier and Emilio Segrè - produced technetium-97, the first artificial element. Segrè and Glenn T. Seaborg later isolated the metastable isotope Tc-99m that, having just a 6-hour half-life, found useful applications in medical radiographic scanning.
- Antiproton: co-discovered in a 1955 by Emilio Segrè and Owen Chamberlain, both awarded with Nobel Prize. They brought experimental evidence of the existence of the proton's antiparticle.
- W and Z bosons (collaboration in discovery): discovered by Cern's UA1 and UA2. In 1976 Carlo Rubbia, Peter McIntyre and David Cline suggested the creation of the CERN's proton-antiproton collider. C. Rubbia led a team of physicists in the UA1 Collaboration, managing the construction of the central detector, which allowed to obtain experimental evidence of the bosons in 1982-'83; in November 1982 the first W candidate was found; the discovery was reported during a workshop in Rome the following year (12-14 January) and then internationally. Simon van der Meer contribution has been vital for stocking large quantities of anti-protons. Both S. Meer and C. Rubbia have been awarded with the Nobel prize.

== Astronomy ==
- Ceres: father Giuseppe Piazzi was the first to discover an asteroid he called Ceres, the major object in the Asteroid belt of the Solar System, and considered a dwarf planet by modern astronomic terminology. He cataloged 7,646 stars, demonstrating that most stars are in relative motion to the Sun. He also discovered the proper motion of the double star 61 Cygni. The asteroid 1000 Piazzia and a Moon's crater have been christened with his name.

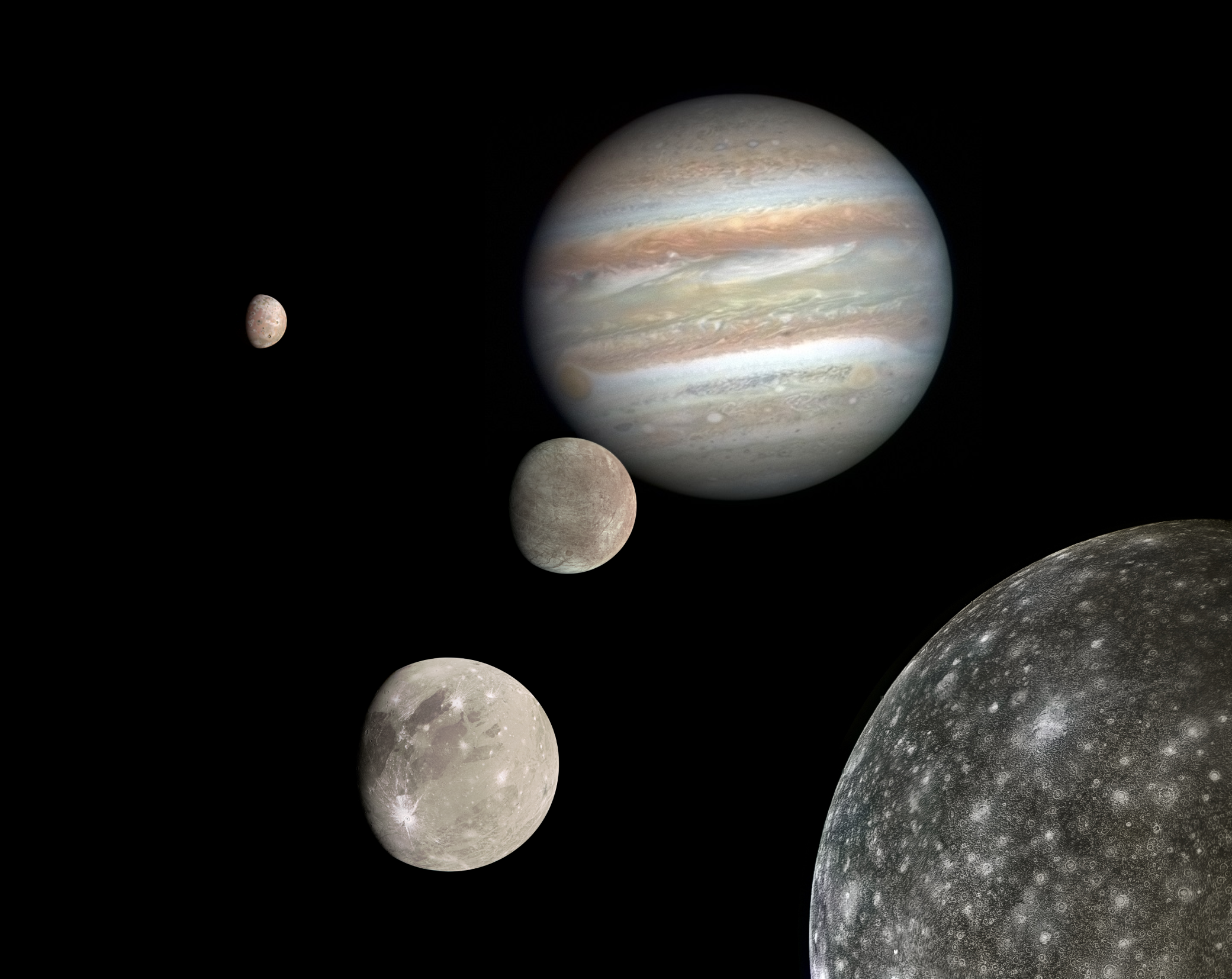
Jupiter moons, discovered in 1610 and named by Galileo Galilei thanks to his enhanced telescope.

- Jupiter moons, discovered in 1610 and named by Galileo Galilei thanks to his enhanced telescope. These moons were found orbiting around Jupiter. If the Aristotelic geocentric theory had been correct, then these moons could not have existed. This discovery, along with his observation of the phases of Venus, gave proof of a heliocentric universe.
- Jupiter Great Red Spot, observed by Giovanni Domenico Cassini.
- Lagrangian orbits: mathematician and astronomer Giuseppe Luigi Lagrangia, also known as Joseph Louis Lagrange, was one of the creators of the calculus of variations and discovered the points of libration in a planetary orbit, now called Lagrangian Points, by studying the astronomic and mathematic problem of calculating the evolution during time of three celestial bodies (such as Sun, Earth and Moon) concurrent orbits.
- Moon's mountains and valleys, observed by Galileo. These observations led to a radical change from obsolete Aristotelian theories (considering the celestial realm unchanging and eternal).
- Meteor shower's origin, demonstrated by Giovanni Schiaparelli to be the remnants of comets. He also conducted studies on double stars, Mercury, Venus, and Mars (describing its canals).
- Saturn rings, planar rings of icy particles orbiting Saturn; they were first spotted by Galileo, although their true nature has been unveiled only later.
- Tethys, Dione, Rhea and Iapetus, four of the main moons of Saturn, were discovered by G. Cassini.
- Sun spots, dark spots on the surface of the Sun visibly contrasting with the surrounding region, discovered by Galileo.

== Military innovations ==
=== Strategies, methods and operations ===
- Air warfare: the Italo-Turkish War saw some technological changes, most notably the use of airplanes in combat. On 23 October 1911, an Italian pilot, Capitano Carlo Piazza, flew over Turkish lines on the world's first aerial reconnaissance mission, and on 1 November, the first aerial bomb was dropped by Sottotenente Giulio Gavotti, on Turkish troops in Libya, from an early model of Etrich Taube aircraft.
- Fabian strategy, a delaying strategy (similar to guerrilla-warfare) first implemented by Quintus Fabius Maximus "Cunctator" in 217 BC.
- Italian fencing style: towards the end of '500, the Italian style, putting an emphasis on skills and speed instead of force, spread across Europe, with fencing being instituted as an art. Italians used a lighter weapon, the rapier, finely balanced and fabulous for attack, together with a style of fencing that was, at the same time, simple, controlled and agile. Italians discovered that using the point of the sword was more effective than relying on its edge. The early English fencing style was substituted by the continental one.
- Beretta: founded around 1526 by Bartolomeo Beretta, the Fabbrica d'Armi Pietro Beretta is the world's oldest manufacturing company and can be considered the oldest industry; during the Venetian-Turkish war (1570–73) Beretta produced 300 weapons per-day. According to Marco Morin and Robert Held, well-known experts in military history, in the 16th century the Brescian valley became "an envied supplier of weapons on a global scale, which for the unsurpassed quality and strength of its products and above all of its gun barrels beat the great metallurgical centers of the time like Suhl, Augsburg and Nuremberg, in Germany": weapons were purchased by different Italian States, France and England. In 1975, Beretta introduced the 9mm Model 92, which met worldwide diffusion as the self loading pistol most adopted by armies and law enforcement.

=== Troops ===
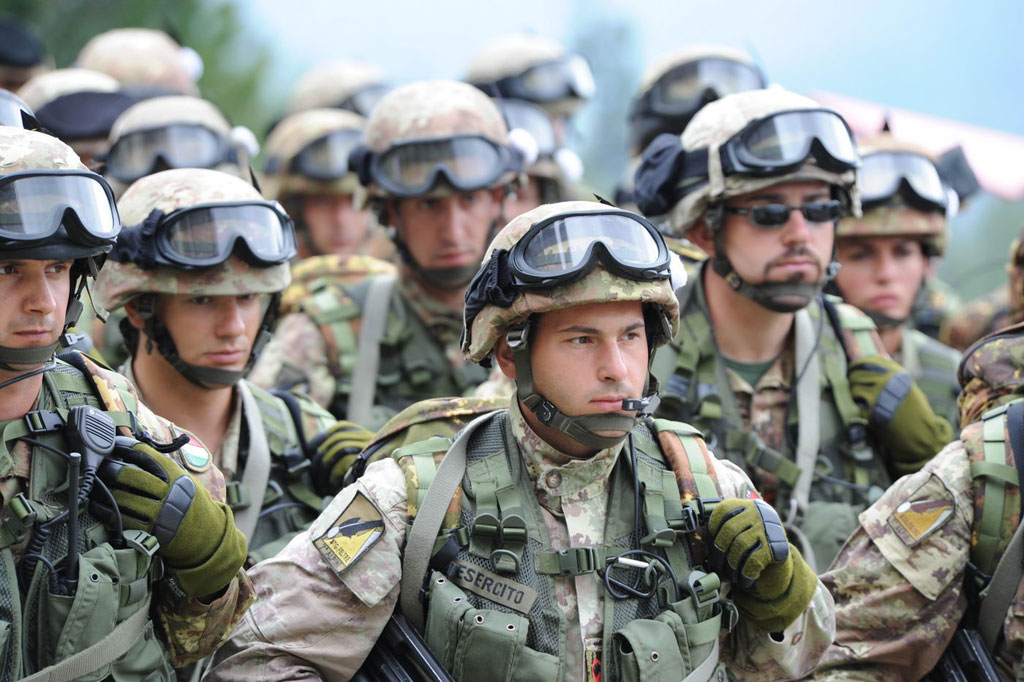
Alpini: modern special forces intended for mountain warfare, created in 1872

- Frogmen: the first modern frogmen were the World War II Italian commando frogmen.
- Marine infantry -as modern concept of armed troops for defending ships in combat, repel mutinies, and perform organized military landings- were created in various Italian maritime states, most notable are the Fanti da mar of the Republic of Venice established around 1550. Their tradition is continued by Italian elite troops San Marco Regiment.
- Alpini: modern special forces intended for mountain warfare, created in 1872. The first 15 Alpini companies were officially established by Kingdom of Italy on 15 October. The Italian example was soon followed by other countries having mountainous areas and thus France formed the Chasseurs des Alpes, in Germany the Alpenkorps were born, in Austro-Hungarian Empire the Landwehr and the Tyrolean hunters (Kaiserjäger); similar troops appeared in Czechoslovakia, Poland, Switzerland and Spain. During WWI the Alps have been the major theater of mountain warfare (also called Alpine warfare).

== Music ==
=== Notation and performance ===
- Modern music notation, theorized by Guido di Arezzo in his work Micrologus de disciplina artis musicae (1026).
- Guidonian solmization, assigning each note of the diatonic scale to a Solfège (or sol-fa) syllable. This represents a practical method for teaching sight-singing (singing music from written notation). Guido di Arezzo chose the syllables from the first syllable in each line of the Latin hymn Ut queant laxis (Hymn to John the Baptist): ut (or do), re, mi, fa, sol, la, si (subsequent convention).
- Ballet, invented and performed for the first time in Florence during the Italian Renaissance.
- Bel canto, a style that reigned supreme in Italian theaters, concert halls, and churches throughout the eighteenth and early nineteenth centuries.
- Cantata, (from Italian cantare, sing), originally designating a musical composition meant to be sung as opposed to be instrumentally performed (viz., sonata); now vaguely used for compositions featuring both voices and instruments. The early "cantata" have been written by Italians, and this word was used for the first time by the Italian composer Alessandro Grandi; there had been precursors (such as strophic arias, and late madrigals of Claudio Monteverdi).
- Libretto, grouping opera text; the earliest operas had their words printed in small books (lit. libretto) for commemoration (see also melodramma).

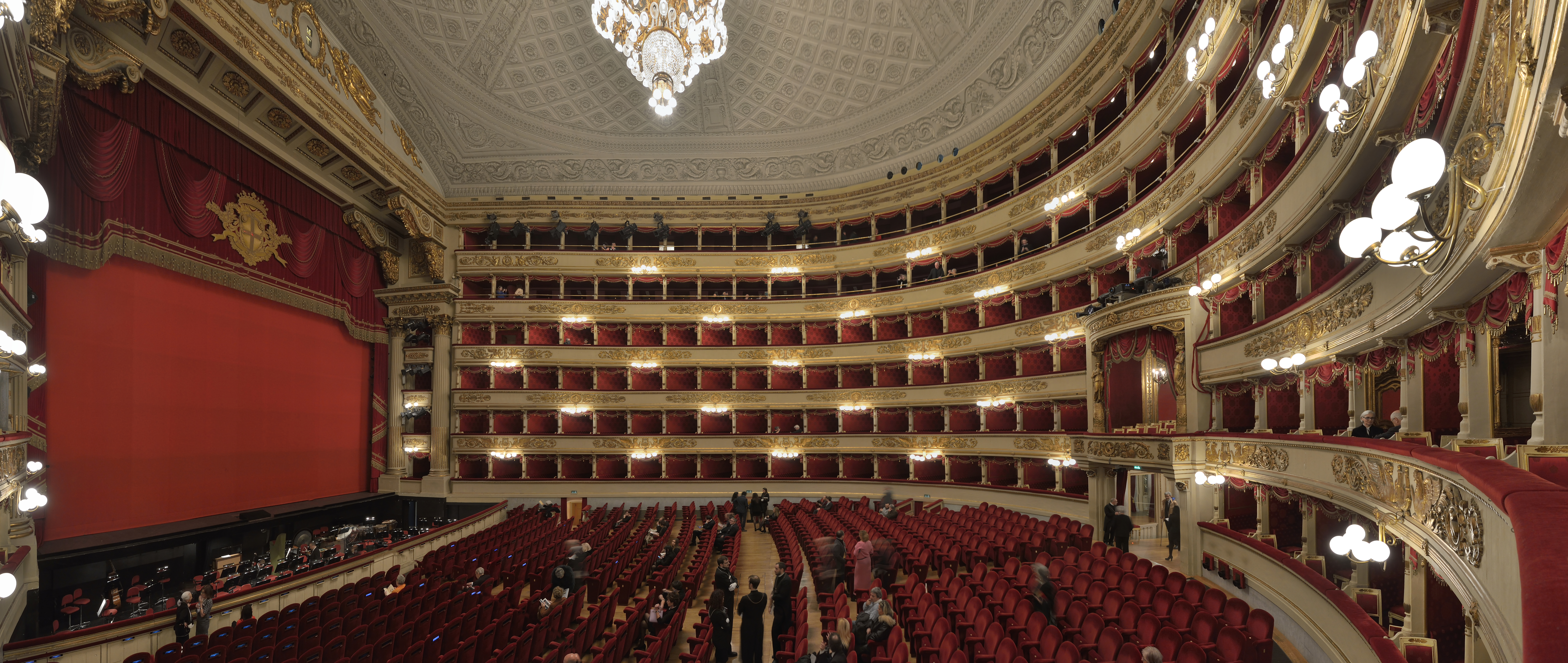
Opera, the earliest (1597) being written by Ottavio Rinuccini, put to music by Jacopo Peri

- Opera, the earliest (1597) being written by Ottavio Rinuccini, put to music by Jacopo Peri and titled 'Dafne' (also see Neapolitan genre Opera Buffa).
- Oratorio, large musical composition for orchestra, choir and soloists, usually narrative and sacred in nature; the first surviving being Rappresentazione di anima et di corpo (lit. The Representation of Soul and Body) by Emilio del Cavaliere, characterized by dramatic action and ballet. Later, Giacomo Carissimi's o. verged towards a more sober expression, adopting Old Testament text written in Latin.
- Symphony (origins): symphonies are written, usually orchestral, instrumental compositions. Their starting point can be located in Lombardy around 1730; in specific, they are to be found in Alessandro Scarlatti's opera overtures, showing a fast-slow-fast structure (Allegro-Adagio-Allegro) that later spread throughout Europe. A second type of symphony, bipartite slow-fast, emerged from the compositions of Italian-French Giovanni Battista Lulli. However, the etymology of the word is συμφωνία ("agreement or concord of sound"), and the concept existed at least since the mid-16th century. Early orchestral compositions have been written by Giovanni Gabrieli, with the vivid Italian style being prosecuted by his pupil Heinrich Schütz. Giovanni Battista Sammartini transformed the opera overtures in concerts of their own (e.g. Memet, 1732). Joseph Haydn inserted a fourth movement (in the form of "Minuet dance") in the structure of A. Scarlatti.

=== Contemporary Styles ===
- Italo dance a style of music popular in the 1970-1980s
- Italo disco a style of music popular in the 1980s
- Italo house a style of music popular in the late 1980s
- Lento violento: a style of music popular in the late 1990s.

== Food and Cuisine ==
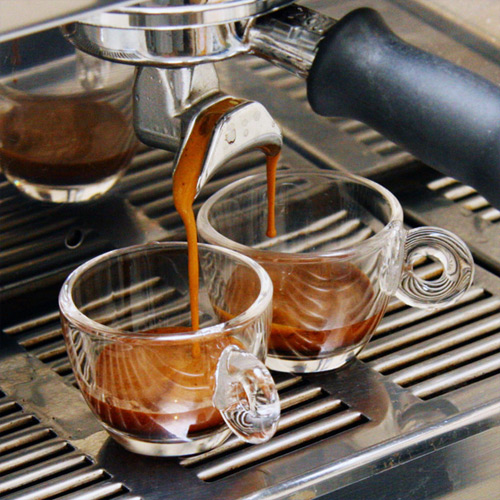
Espresso is a coffee brewed by forcing a small amount of nearly boiling water under pressure through finely ground coffee beans. The term espresso comes from the Italian esprimere, which means 'to express', and refers to the process by which hot water is forced under pressure through ground coffee.

- Carbonara: Italian dish from Rome.
- Ravioli: a type of pasta in the form of a case with meat or cheese filling.
- Tortellini: ring shaped pasta that originates from Emilia-Romagna.
- Macaroni: a dry pasta that has a narrow tube shape.
- Gelato: the Renaissance alchemist Cosimo Ruggieri created the first gelato flavor at the Medici's court, in Florence: the 'fior di latte'. The architect Bernardo Buontalenti invented the 'egg cream' gelato. In 1903 Italo Marchioni patented a machine for producing the gelato cone.
- Cannoli: Italian tubed shape shells of fried pastry dough.
- Tiramisu: traditional Italian dessert featuring mascarpone cheese, chocolate shavings, and espresso.
- Espresso: a coffee-brewing method.
- Nutella, spread made from cocoa, hazelnuts and palm oil; created by the Ferrero firm in 1964.
- Mozzarella: southern Italian cheese made from Italian buffalo's milk by the pasta filata method.
- Marinara sauce: tomato sauce made with tomatoes, garlic, herbs and onions.
- Ciabatta: Italian white bread made from wheat flour, water, salt, yeast, and olive oil.
- Breadstick: long and thin sticks of crisp of dry baked bread that was invented in Italy.
- Risotto: Northern Italian rice dish.
- Broccoli: broccoli resulted from breeding of landrace Brassica crops in the northern Mediterranean starting in about the sixth century BCE. Broccoli has its origins in primitive cultivars grown in the Roman Empire and was most likely improved via artificial selection in the southern Italian Peninsula or in Sicily.
- Pasta filata: a technique in the manufacture of a family of Italian cheeses.

== Sport ==
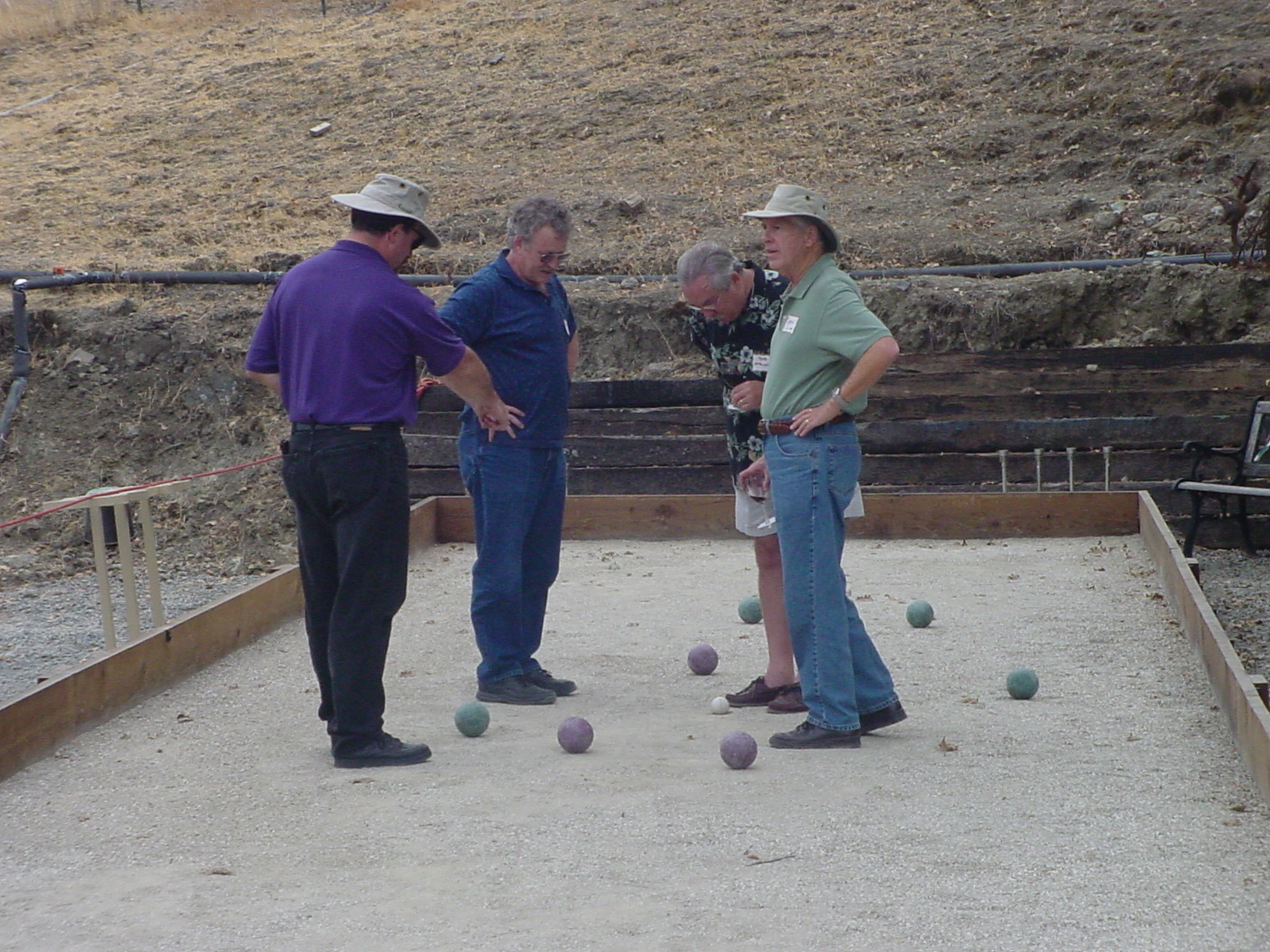
Bocce, a boules-type game dating back to Roman times

- Bocce, a boules-type game dating back to Roman times and later developed in Italy; bocce volo as a variant. The game was spread across Europe by the Romans and is closely related to the later British bowls and French boules.
- Calcio Fiorentino or historic football. The Vocabolario della Crusca (first edited in 1612) noted: "Calcio [lit. soccer, football, kick] is also the name of an ancient and proper game of the city of Florence, like an orderly battle, with a ball, resembling the spheromachy, passed from Greeks to Latins and from Latins to us". The noble Piero de 'Medici summoned the most skilled players to his court, thus representing the first patronage applied to football. In the Great Britain of the 19th century, soccer evolved into modern regulation.
- Sicilian Defence: in the game of Chess, an opening move created in Italy around the 16th century and described for the first time in a Chess theory book of 1594 by Chess Master Giulio Cesare Polerio.
- Five-pins billiard game and Goriziana pin billiard game.
- Italian playing cards and related games, such as Scopa, Scopone scientifico, Tressette, Asso pigliatutto, Briscola.
- Palio: initially used to indicate speed competitions, usually with horses, it later embraced many other peculiarities, evolving into a group of typical manifestations dating back to various Italian medieval cities.

== Geography ==
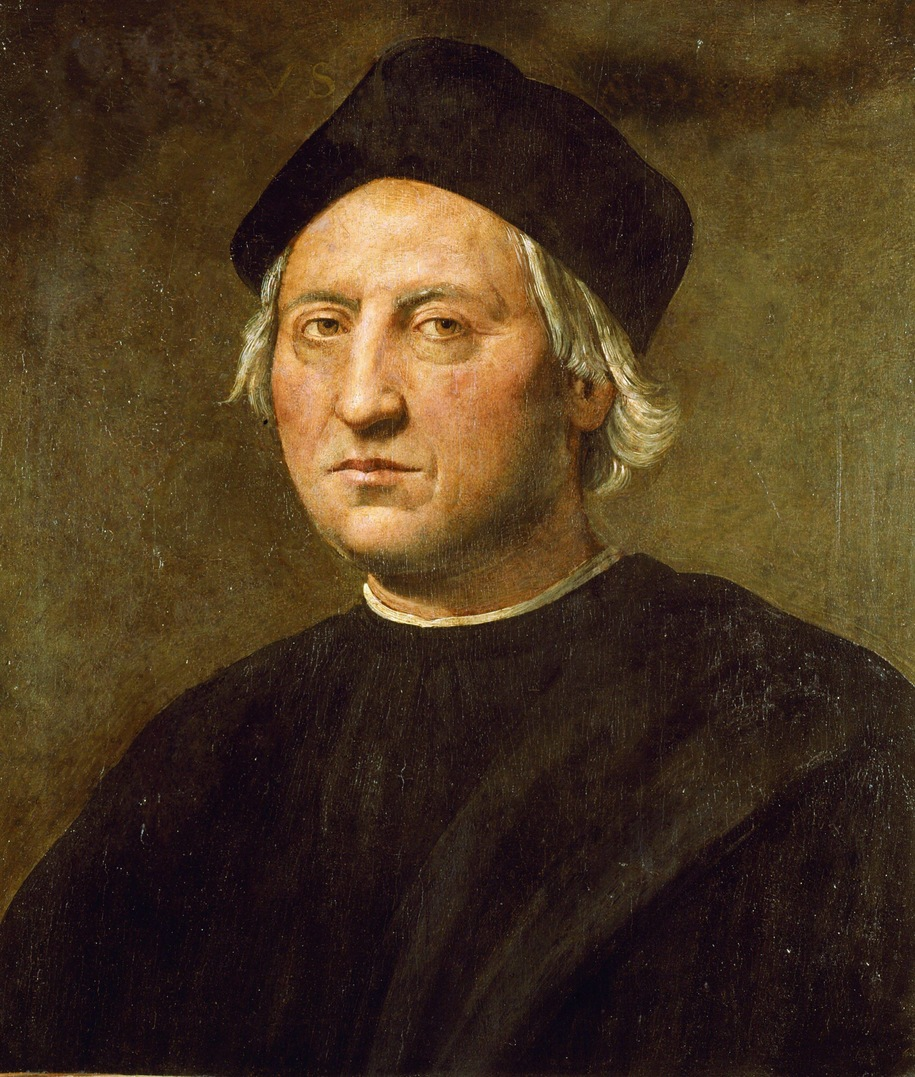
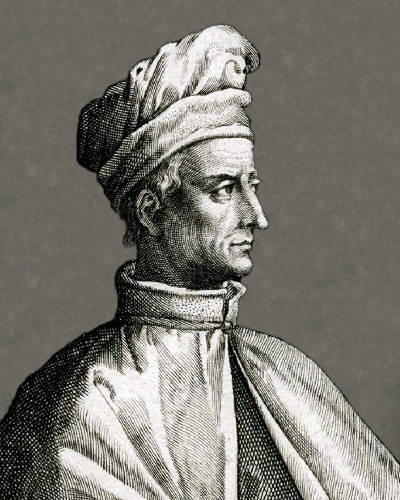
The Italian explorer Christopher Columbus (left) leads an expedition to the New World, 1492. His voyages are celebrated as the discovery of the Americas from a European perspective, and they opened a new era in the history of humankind and sustained contact between the two worlds. Amerigo Vespucci (right), Italian explorer from whose name the term "America" is derived

The following is an extract of the most noteworthy geographical discoveries, partially or totally Italian:

- Americas America as a continent has been explored and inhabited by American natives (since 17,000 years ago) and the Vikings (with even conjectures of Roman presence); Christopher Columbus (Italian: Cristoforo Colombo [kriˈstɔːforo koˈlombo]) is credited for introducing the 'New World' to the major European powers and, by extension, to Western Europe. The year of his discovery (1492 AD) symbolically marks the starting point of western colonialism and the modern age of history. Later, the Italian explorer and cartographer Amerigo Vespucci came to the conclusion that the land (discovered by Colombo) was a new continent, which has been named after him.
- North America's Atlantic coast:
  - John Cabot (Italian: Giovanni Caboto [dʒoˈvanni kaˈbɔːto]) was the first European to explore the coast since the Vikings; he discovered Newfoundland and Cape Breton Island.
  - Giovanni da Verrazzano was the first European to discover New York Bay and Narragansett Bay, exploring the coast between Florida and New Brunswick.

== See also ==
- List of Italian inventors
- List of Italian scientists
- List of Italian mathematicians
- List of Italian philosophers
- List of Italian explorers
- List of Italian dishes
- Roman technology, containing a list about Roman engineering achievements.
- Science and technology in Italy
