= Science and technology in Italy =

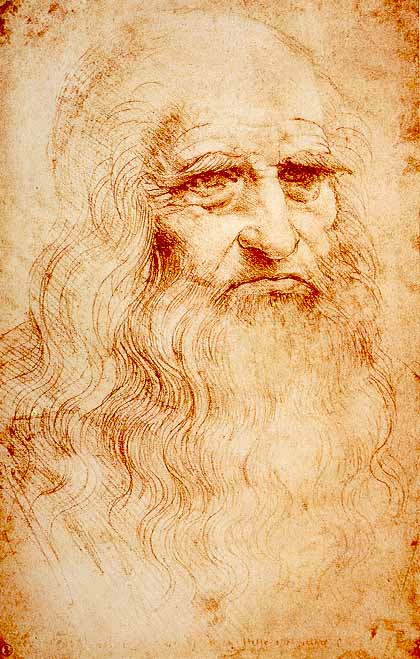
Leonardo da Vinci, a polymath of the High Renaissance who was active as a painter, draughtsman, engineer, scientist, theorist, sculptor, and architect

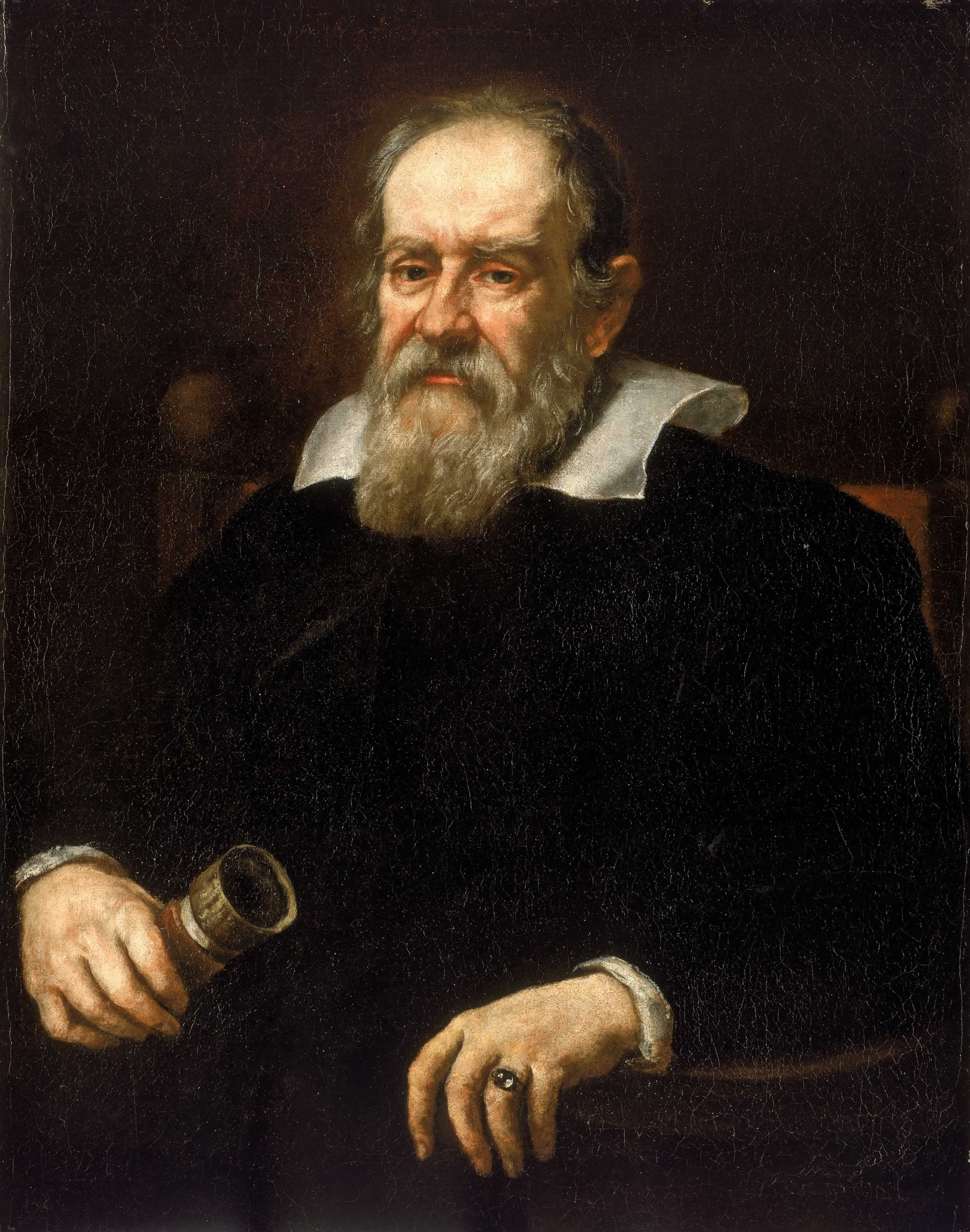
Galileo Galilei, an astronomer, physicist, engineer, and polymath, played a major role in the Scientific Revolution. He is considered the father of observational astronomy, modern physics, the scientific method, and modern science.

Science and technology in Italy has a long presence, from the Roman era and the Renaissance. Through the centuries, it has made many significant inventions and discoveries in biology, physics, chemistry, mathematics, astronomy, and other sciences. In 2019, Italy was the world's sixth-highest producer of scientific articles, publishing more than 155,000 documents. From 1996 to 2000, it published two million. It ranked 28th in the Global Innovation Index for 2025.

== History ==
As early as the 1st century AD, Rome had become one of the biggest and most advanced cities in the world. The ancient Romans invented new technologies to improve the city's sanitation systems, roads, and buildings. They developed a system of aqueducts that piped fresh water into the city, and they built sewers that removed the city's waste. The wealthiest Romans lived in large houses with gardens. Most of the population lived in apartment buildings made of stone, concrete, or limestone. The Romans developed new techniques and used materials such as volcanic soil from Pozzuoli, a village near Naples, to make their cement harder and stronger. This concrete allowed them to build large apartment buildings called insulae.

Italy had a scientific "golden age" during the Renaissance. Leonardo da Vinci, was trained to be a painter, but his interests and achievements spread into an astonishing variety of fields that are now considered scientific specialties. He conceived ideas vastly ahead of his time. Notably, he invented concepts for the helicopter, an armed fighting vehicle, the use of concentrated solar power, the calculator, a rudimentary theory of plate tectonics, the double hull, and many others, using inspiration from Chinese ideas. In addition, he greatly advanced the fields of knowledge in anatomy, astronomy, civil engineering, optics, and hydrodynamics.

The scientist Galileo Galilei is called the first modern scientist. His work constitutes a significant break from that of Aristotle and medieval philosophers and scientists (who were then referred to as "natural philosophers"). Galileo's achievements include improvements to the telescope, various astronomical observations, and initial formulation of the first and second laws of motion. Galileo was suppressed by the Catholic Church, but was a founder of modern science. Other astronomers, such as Giovanni Domenico Cassini and Giovanni Schiaparelli, made discoveries about the Solar System. In mathematics, Joseph Louis Lagrange was active before leaving Italy. Giuseppe Peano, Lagrange, Fibonacci, and Gerolamo Cardano, whose Ars Magna is generally recognized as the first modern treatment on mathematics, made fundamental advances to the field. Luca Pacioli established accounting principles. Physicist Enrico Fermi, a Nobel Prize laureate, led the team in Chicago that developed the first nuclear reactor. Fermi helped design the atomic bomb as part of the Manhattan Project. Italian physicists Emilio Segrè, who discovered the elements technetium and astatine, and the antiproton; Bruno Rossi, a pioneer in Cosmic Rays and X-ray astronomy; and other physicists were forced to leave Italy in the 1930s due to Fascist laws against Jews.

Other physicists include Amedeo Avogadro (contributions to molecular theory), Evangelista Torricelli (inventor of the barometer), Alessandro Volta (inventor of the electric battery), Guglielmo Marconi (inventor of radio), Galileo Ferraris and Antonio Pacinotti (pioneers of the induction motor), Alessandro Cruto (pioneer of the light bulb), and Innocenzo Manzetti (pioneer of automatons and robotics), Ettore Majorana (discovered Majorana fermions), Carlo Rubbia (1984 Nobel Prize in physics), and Antonio Meucci (developing voice-communication device sometimes credited as the first telephone). In 1964, Pier Giorgio Perotto designed one of the first desktop programmable calculators, the Programma 101.

In biology, Francesco Redi was the first to challenge the theory of spontaneous generation by demonstrating that maggots come from eggs of flies. Marcello Malpighi founded microscopic anatomy; his student Antonio Maria Valsalva became famous for his research focused on the anatomy of the ears, and Valvasia pupil Giovanni Battista Morgagni is the anatomist generally regarded as the father of modern anatomical pathology. Lazzaro Spallanzani conducted research in bodily functions, animal reproduction, and cellular theory. Camillo Golgi, whose many achievements include the discovery of the Golgi complex. Rita Levi-Montalcini, who discovered the nerve growth factor, was awarded the 1986 Nobel Prize in Physiology or Medicine). Giulio Natta received the 1963 Nobel Prize in Chemistry for work on high polymers. Giuseppe Occhialini received the 1979 Wolf Prize in Physics for the discovery of the pion or pi-meson decay in 1947. Ennio De Giorgi, a Wolf Prize in Mathematics recipient in 1990, solved Bernstein's problem about minimal surfaces and the 19th Hilbert problem on the regularity of solutions of elliptic partial differential equations.

The first internal combustion engine was invented by Eugenio Barsanti and Felice Matteucci, the Barsanti-Matteucci engine, in 1852. It was fueled by a mix of air and hydrogen. The first gasoline internal combustion engine motor vehicle was invented by Enrico Bernardi in 1884. The first pc (personal computer), the Olivetti P6040 and the P6060 was invented by Olivetti engineer Pier Giorgio Perotto in 1975.

== Accademia dei Lincei ==
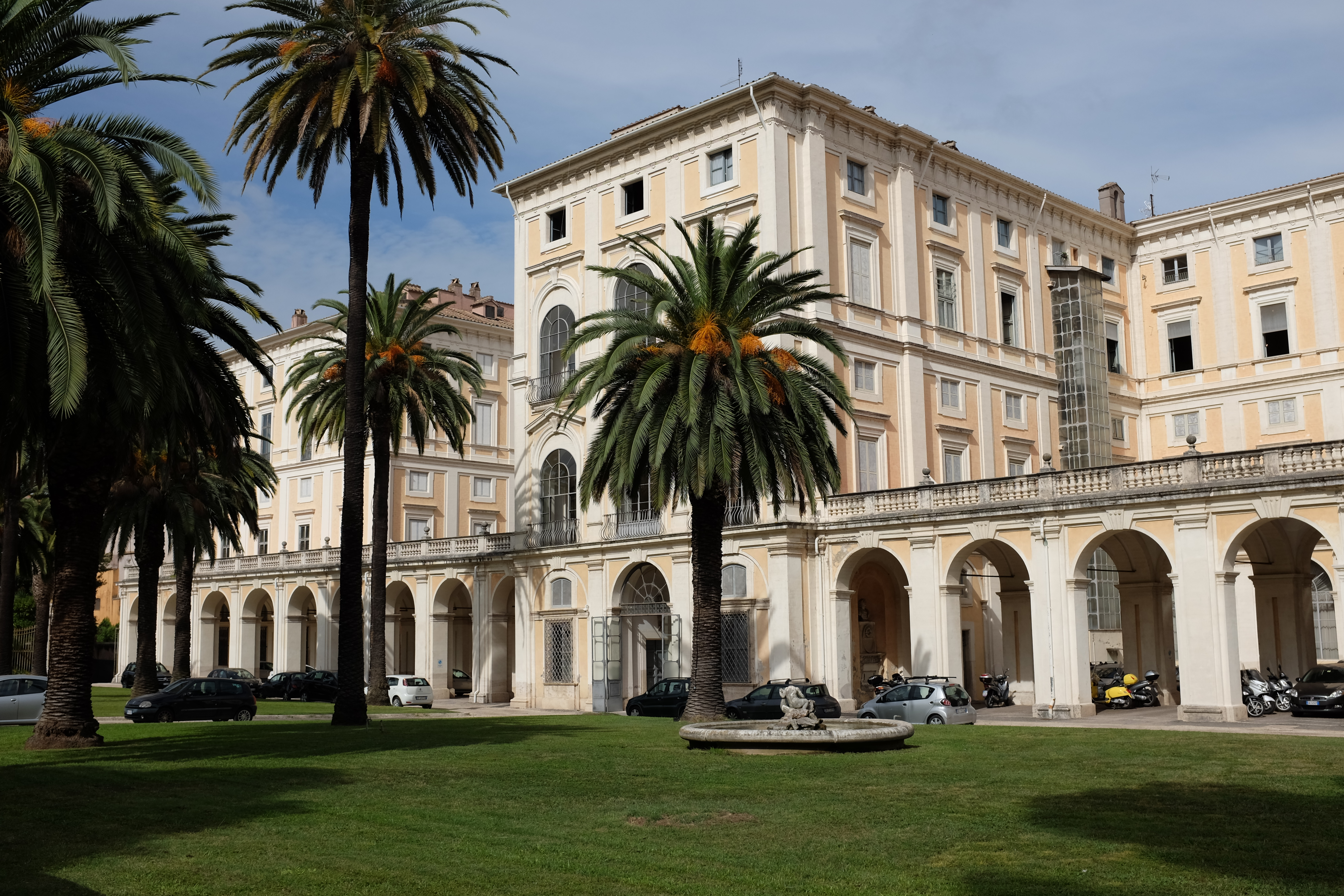
Palazzo Corsini in Rome, seat of the Accademia dei Lincei

The Accademia dei Lincei (Italian pronunciation: [akkaˈdɛːmja dei linˈtʃɛi]; literally the "Academy of the Lynx-Eyed", but anglicised as the Lincean Academy) is one of the oldest and most prestigious European scientific institutions, located at the Palazzo Corsini on the Via della Lungara in Rome, Italy.

Founded in the Papal States in 1603 by Federico Cesi, the academy was named after the lynx, an animal whose sharp vision symbolizes the observational prowess that science requires. Galileo Galilei was the intellectual centre of the academy and adopted "Galileo Galilei Linceo" as his signature. "The Lincei did not long survive the death in 1630 of Cesi, its founder and patron", and "disappeared in 1651".

During the nineteenth century, it was revived, first in the Vatican and later in the nation of Italy. Thus the Pontifical Academy of Sciences, established in 1936, claims this heritage as the Accademia Pontificia dei Nuovi Lincei ("Pontifical Academy of the New Lynxes"), founded in 1847, descending from the first two incarnations of the academy. Similarly, a lynx-eyed academy of the 1870s became the national academy of Italy, encompassing both literature and science among its concerns.

== Main universities ==
QS World University Rankings
#	Institution	2004	2005	2006	2007	2008	2009	2010	2011	2012	2013	2014	2015	2016	2018	2019
1	Polytechnic University of Milan (Politecnico di Milano)	200+	200+	311	343	291	286	295	277	244	230	229	187	183	170	156
2	University of Bologna (Alma Mater Studiorum – Università di Bologna)	186	159	207	173	192	174	176	183	194	188	182	204	208	188	180
3	Sapienza University of Rome (Sapienza – Università di Roma)	162	125	197	183	205	205	190	210	216	196	202	213	223	215	217
4	Polytechnic University of Turin (Politecnico di Torino)	-	-	-	500+	500+	400+	450+	450+	400+	370	365	314	305	307	387
5	University of Padua (Università degli Studi di Padova)	200+	200+	370	312	296	312	261	263	298	267	262	309	338	296	249
6	University of Milan (Università degli Studi di Milano)	-	-	-	-	500+	500+	450+	275	256	235	238	306	370	325	325
7	University of Pisa (Università di Pisa)	200+	200+	326	325	333	322	300	322	314	259	245	367	431-440	421-430	422
9	University of Florence (Università degli Studi di Firenze)	200+	199	338	329	349	377	328	360	400+	379	352	411-420	451-460	461-470	501-510
10	University of Rome Tor Vergata (Università degli Studi di Roma – Tor Vergata)	-	-	423	416	400+	400+	400+	380	336	320	305	401-410	481-490	461-470	511-520
11	University of Naples Federico II (Università degli Studi di Napoli – Federico II)	-	-	-	420	398	400+	400+	400+	450+	397	345	441-450	481-490	481-490	472

== Research ==
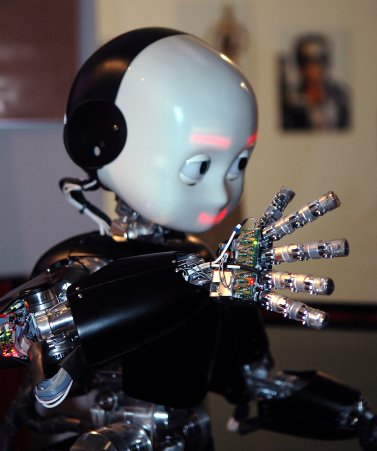
iCub robot at the Genoa Science Festival, Italy, in 2009

The National Research Council (Italian: Consiglio Nazionale delle Ricerche, CNR) is the main Italian public research body. Supervised by the Ministry of university and Research, has the task of carrying out, promoting, disseminating, transferring and enhancing scientific and technological research activities in the main sectors of knowledge development and their applications, promoting scientific progress, technological, economic and social. According to the scientific journal Nature, in 2018 the CNR ranked 10th among the most innovative public research bodies in the world for the number of scientific articles published in about 80 journals monitored by the same journal.

Laboratori Nazionali del Gran Sasso (LNGS) is the largest underground research center in the world. Situated below Gran Sasso mountain in Italy, it is well known for particle physics research by the INFN. In addition to a surface portion of the laboratory, there are extensive underground facilities beneath the mountain. The nearest towns are L'Aquila and Teramo. The facility is located about 120 km from Rome. The primary mission of the laboratory is to host experiments that require a low background environment in the fields of astroparticle physics and nuclear astrophysics and other disciplines that can profit of its characteristics and of its infrastructures. The LNGS is, like the three other European underground astroparticle laboratories (Laboratoire Souterrain de Modane, Laboratorio subterráneo de Canfranc, and Boulby Underground Laboratory), a member of the coordinating group ILIAS.

ELETTRA, Eurac Research, ESA Centre for Earth Observation, Institute for Scientific Interchange, International Centre for Genetic Engineering and Biotechnology, Centre for Maritime Research and Experimentation and the International Centre for Theoretical Physics conduct basic research. Trieste has the highest percentage of researchers in Europe in relation to the population. Italy was ranked 26th in the Global Innovation Index in 2023. The country and especially the Italian Institute of Technology have produced some ingenious humanoid robots like iCub.

== CINECA ==
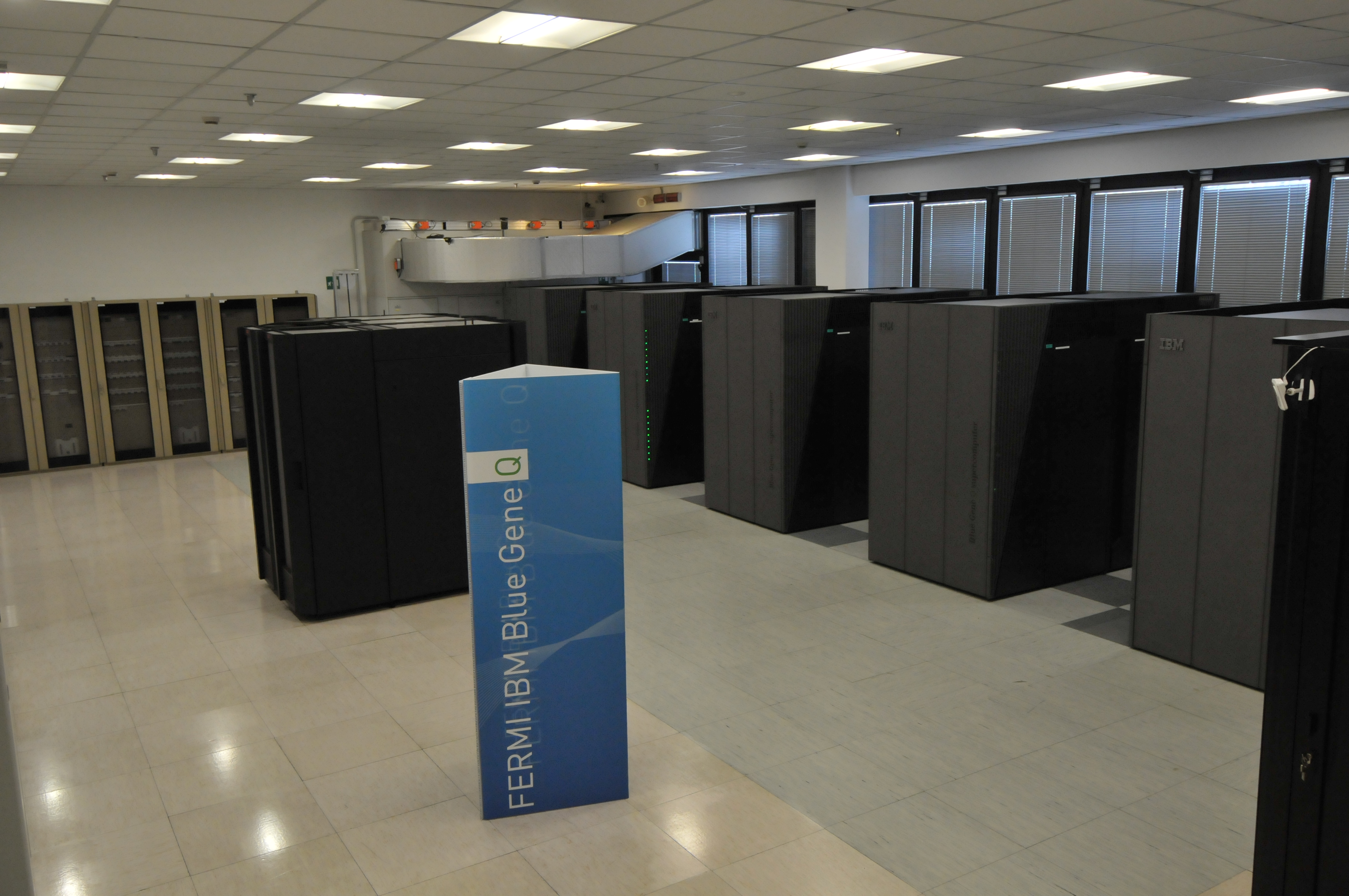
The Fermi IBM Blue Gene/Q supercomputer in Cineca

CINECA is a non-profit consortium, made up of 69 Italian universities, 27 national public research centres, the Italian Ministry of Universities and Research (MUR) and the Italian Ministry of Education (MI), and was established in 1969 in Casalecchio di Reno, Bologna.

It is the most powerful supercomputing centre for scientific research in Italy, as stated in the TOP500 list of the most powerful supercomputers in the world: Marconi100, is ranked at the 18th position of the list as of November 2021, with about 30 P/FLOPS.

The consortium's institutional mission is to support the Italian scientific community through supercomputing and scientific visualisation tools. Since the end of the 1980s, Cineca has broadened the scope of its mission by embracing other IT sectors, developing management and administrative services for universities and designing ICT systems for the exchange of information between the MIUR and the Italian national academic system. The consortium is also strongly committed to transfer technology to many categories of users, from public administration to the private enterprises.

Today it merges the specificities of the other two Italian computing consortia, CILEA and Caspur: as a reference point for technology innovation in Italy, with its services Cineca supporting higher education and research systems.

Cineca takes part in several research projects funded by the European Union for the promotion and development of IT technologies (grid computing, bioinformatic, digital content, the promotion of transnational access to European supercomputing centres, etc.).

== Space agency ==
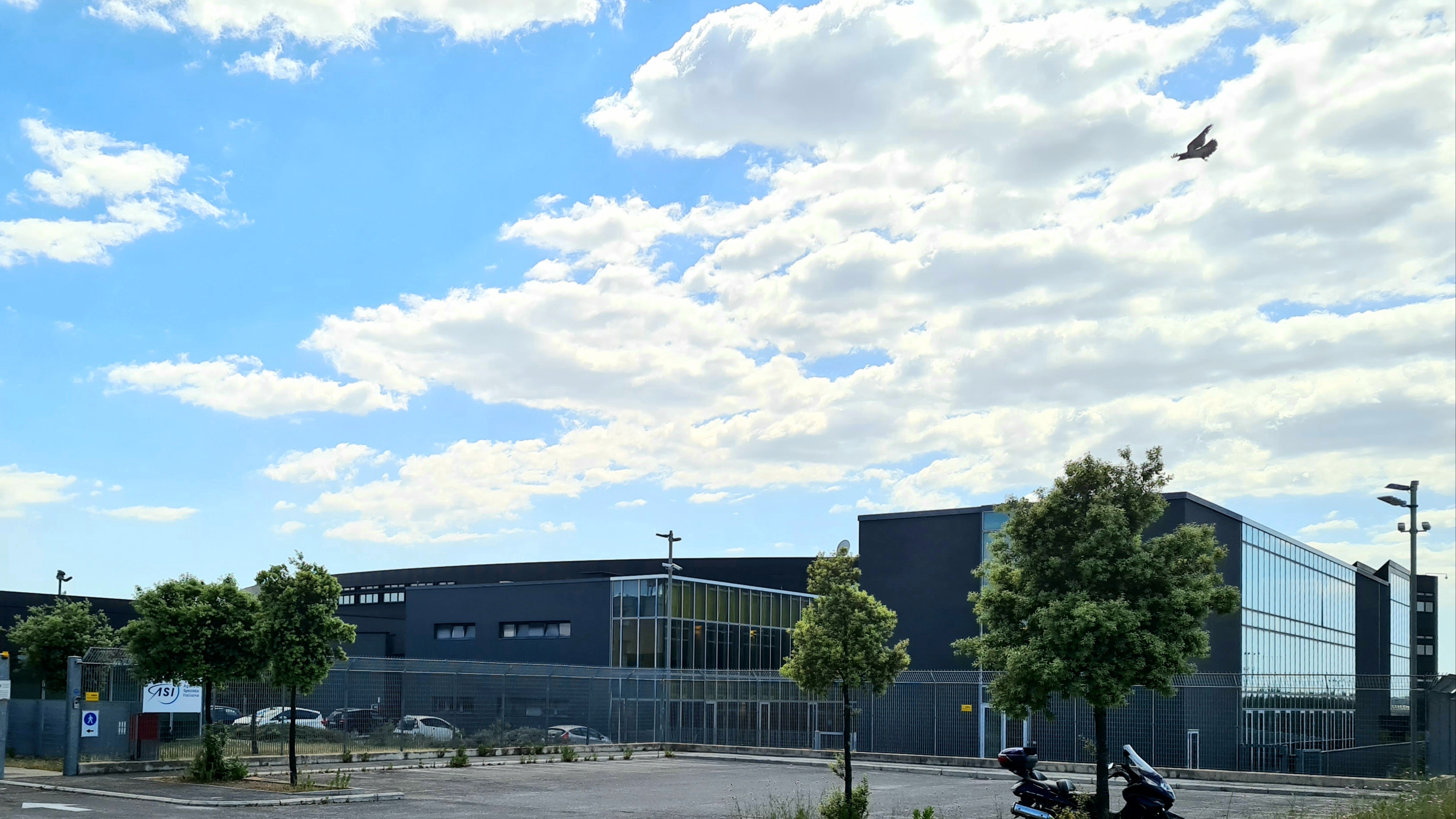
Headquarters of the Italian Space Agency in Rome

The Italian Space Agency (Italian: Agenzia Spaziale Italiana; ASI) is a government agency established in 1988 to fund, regulate and coordinate space exploration activities in Italy. The agency cooperates with numerous national and international entities who are active in aerospace research and technology.

Nationally, ASI is responsible for both drafting the National Aerospace Plan and ensuring it is carried out. To do this the agency operates as the owner/coordinator of a number of Italian space research agencies and assets such as CIRA as well as organising the calls and opportunities process for Italian industrial contractors on spaceflight projects. Internationally, the ASI provides Italy's delegation to the Council of the European Space Agency and to its subordinate bodies as well as representing the country's interests in foreign collaborations.

ASI's main headquarters are located in Rome, Italy, and the agency also has direct control over two operational centres: the Centre for Space Geodesy (CGS) located in Matera in Italy, and its own spaceport, the Broglio Space Centre (formerly the San Marco Equatorial Range) on the coastal sublittoral of Kenya, currently used only as a communications ground station. One further balloon launch base located in Trapani was permanently closed in 2010. In 2020, ASI's annual revenues budget was approximately €2.0 billion and it directly employed around 200 workers.

The three Space Shuttle Multi-Purpose Logistics Module cargo containers Leonardo, Raffaello and Donatello, were manufactured at the Cannes Mandelieu Space Center in Turin, Italy by Alcatel Alenia Space, now Thales Alenia Space. They provide a key function in storing equipment and parts for transfer to the International Space Station. A number of ISS modules have also been made in Italy. As part of ESA's contribution to the costs of the International Space Station, Alcatel Alenia Space manufactured Tranquility, Harmony as well as the Cupola observation deck for NASA. ESA's Columbus module, Western Europe's primary scientific lab on board the ISS, was again built in Turin based on Italy's previous experience in space station module construction.

On 15 December 1964, the first Italian satellite was launched, the San Marco 1, while on 31 July 1992, Franco Malerba, following the STS-46 space mission, was the first Italian to go into space. On 23 November 2014 Samantha Cristoforetti, following the Expedition 42 mission, was the first Italian woman to go into space.

== Science museums ==
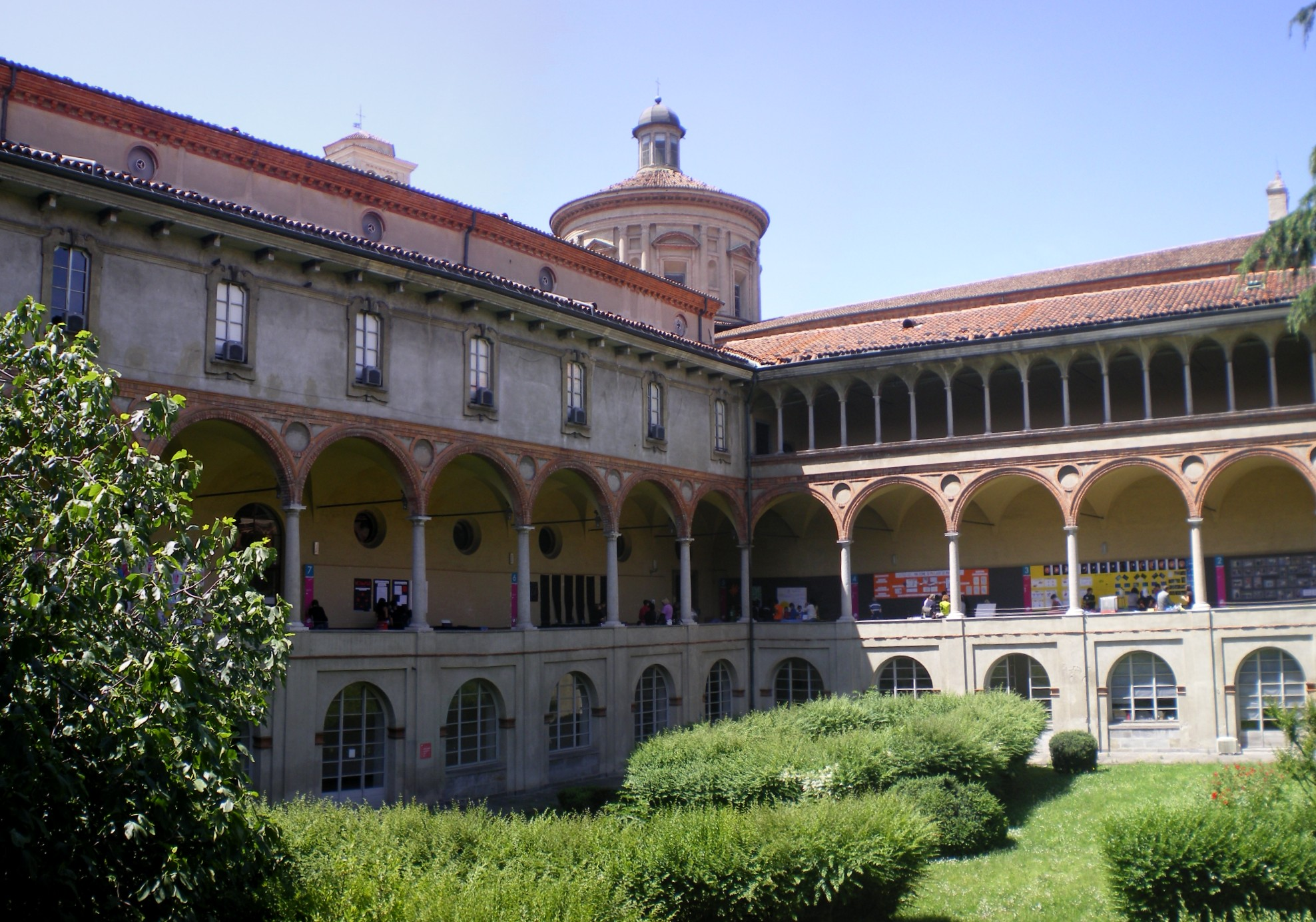
Museo Nazionale Scienza e Tecnologia Leonardo da Vinci in Milan

There are numerous science museums such as the Museo Nazionale Scienza e Tecnologia Leonardo da Vinci in Milan, the Natural History Museum in Milan, the Città della Scienza in Naples, the Institute and Museum of the History of Science in Florence, the Planetario di Milano in Milan, the Museo di Storia Naturale di Firenze in Florence and the La Specola in Florence.

Other Italian science museums are the Museo Civico di Zoologia in Rome, the Museo Civico di Storia Naturale di Trieste, the Faraggiana Ferrandi Natural History Museum in Novara, the Federico Eusebio Civic Museum of Archaeology and Natural Sciences in Alba, the Museo Civico di Storia Naturale Giacomo Doria in Genoa and the Museo del fiore in Acquapendente.

Other museums are the Museo Civico Scienze Naturali Enrico Caffi in Bergamo, the Museo di storia naturale della Maremma in Grosseto, the Museo di Storia Naturale di Venezia in Venice, the Natural History Museum of the University of Pisa in Pisa, the Museum Gherdëina in Ortisei, the Natural History Museum in Pavia, the Turin Museum of Natural History and the Zoological Museum of Naples.

== Technology parks ==
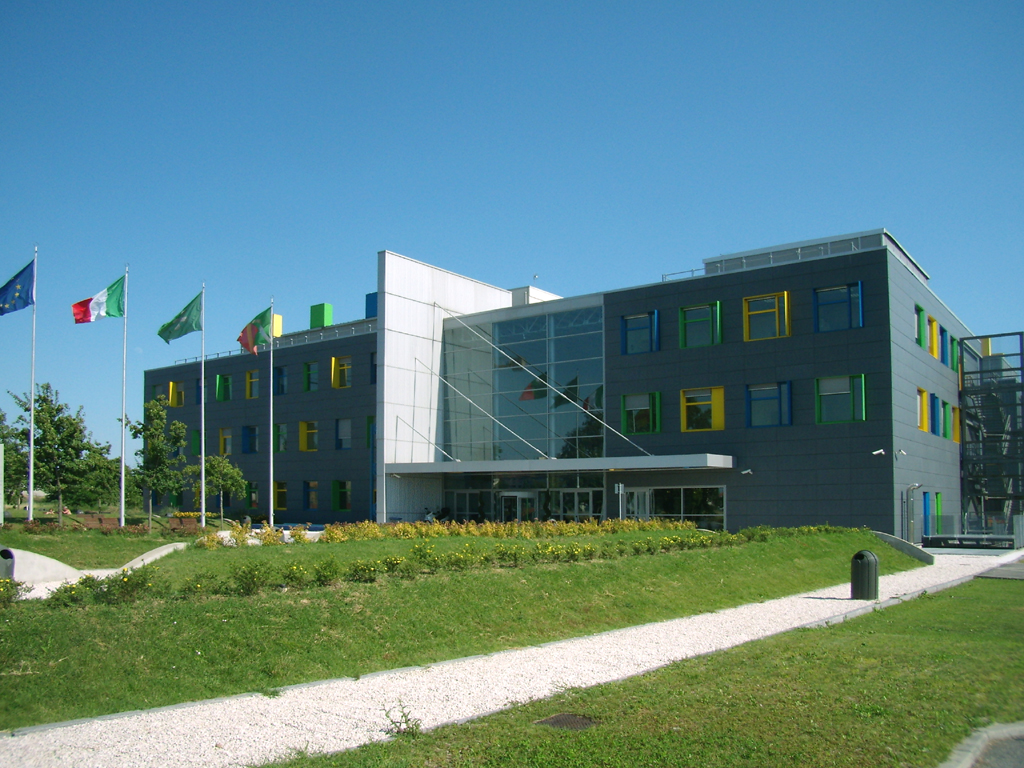
Technology Park of Lodi Cluster in Lodi

There are numerous technology parks in Italy such as the Science and Technology Parks Kilometro Rosso (Bergamo), the AREA Science Park (Trieste), The VEGA-Venice Gateway for Science and Technology (Venice), the Toscana Life Sciences (Siena), the Technology Park of Lodi Cluster (Lodi), Bioindustry Park Silvano Fumero (Canavese) and the Technology Park of Navacchio (Pisa).

Other technology parks in the Northern Italy are the "NOI Techpark Südtirol-Alto Adige" technology park (Bolzano), the "Techno Innovation Park South Tyrol" (Bolzano), the "Trentino Sviluppo" technology park (Rovereto), the "ComoNExT - Innovation Hub" science and technology park (Lomazzo), the "Servitec" science and technology park (Dalmine), the Technological pole (Pavia), the Cremona Technological Pole (Cremona), the CSMT Innovative Contamination Hub (Brescia), the "Bioindustry Park Silvano Fumero" science and technology park (Colleretto Giacosa), the "Tecnogranda" science and technology park (Dronero), the Novara Development Foundation (Novara), the "Environment Park" technology park (Turin), the Science and technology park in the Scrivia Valley (Tortona), the "Galileo" Science and Technology Park (Padua), the "Star" science park (Verona), the Technological center (Pordenone), the "Luigi Danieli" Science and Technology Park (Udine), the "Great Campus" science and technology park (Genoa), the Torricelli Park of Arts and Science Faventia (Faenza) and the Aerospace Technology Center (Forlì).

Other technology parks in the Central and the Southern Italy are the Magona Technological Pole Consortium (Cecina), the Technological and archaeological park of the Grosseto Metalliferous Hills in the province of Grosseto, the Lucca technology center (Lucca), the Technological Pole (Navacchio), the "3A-PTA" technology park (Todi), the "Hub21" scientific, technological and cultural center (Ascoli Piceno), the "Pa.L.Mer" technology park (Latina), the Roman scientific pole (Rome), the "Tecnopolo" technological hub (Rome), the Idis-City of Science Foundation (Naples), the TechNapoli" technology park (Pozzuoli), the Science and Technology Park (Salerno), the "Tecnopolis" science and technology park (Valenzano), the "CALPARK" science and technology park (Rende), the "Magna Graecia" scientific, the technological and multisectoral park (Crotone), the Science and technology park of Sicily (Catania) and the Technology park of Sardinia (Pula).

== Inventions and discoveries ==
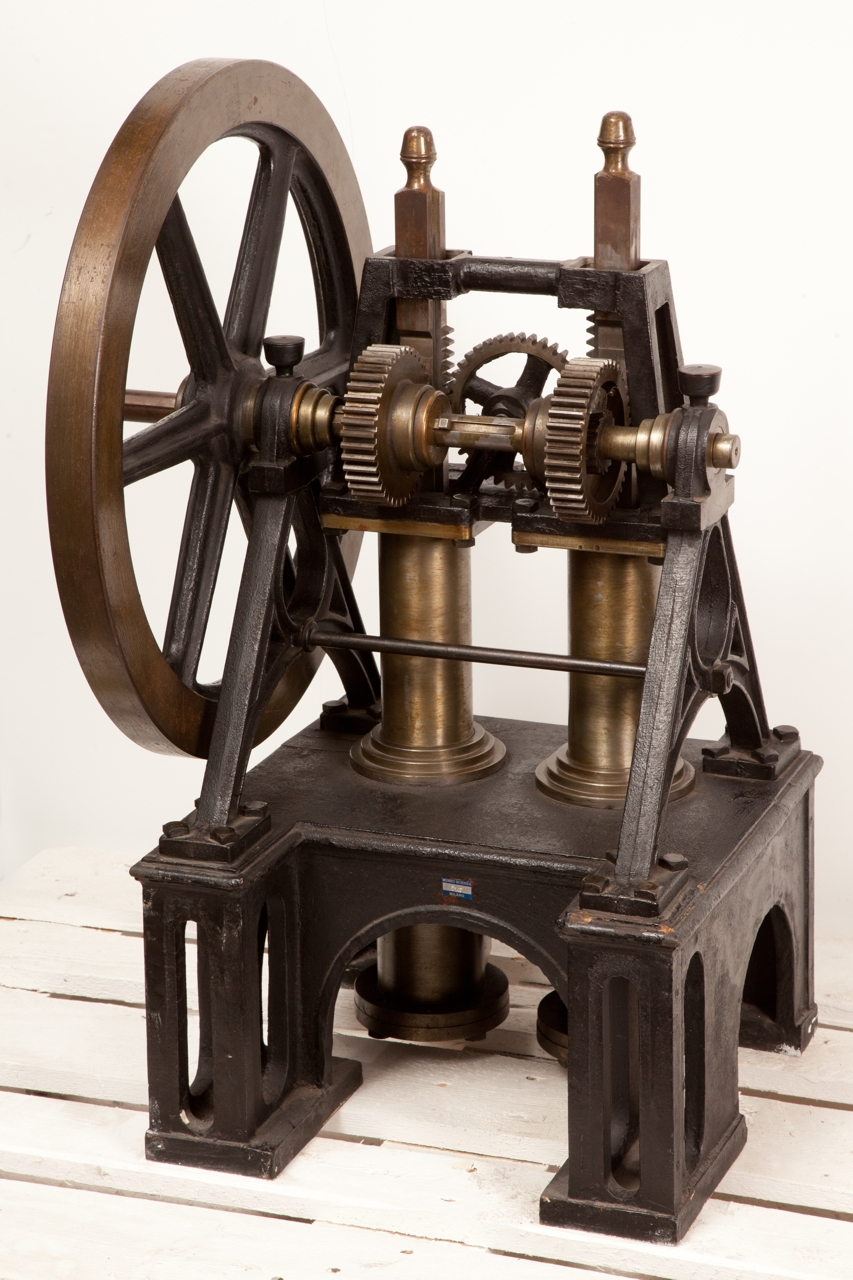
The Barsanti-Matteucci engine, the first proper internal combustion engine

Italian inventions and discoveries are objects, processes or techniques invented, innovated or discovered, partially or entirely, by Italians.

Italian people – living in the Italic peninsula or abroad – have been throughout history the source of important inventions and innovations in the fields of writing, calendar, mechanical and civil engineering, musical notation, celestial observation, perspective, warfare, long distance communication, storage and production of energy, modern medicine, polymerization and information technology.

Italians also contributed in theorizing civil law, scientific method (particularly in the fields of physics and astronomy), double-entry bookkeeping, mathematical algebra and analysis, classical and celestial mechanics. Often, things discovered for the first time are also called inventions and in many cases, there is no clear line between the two.

== Personality ==
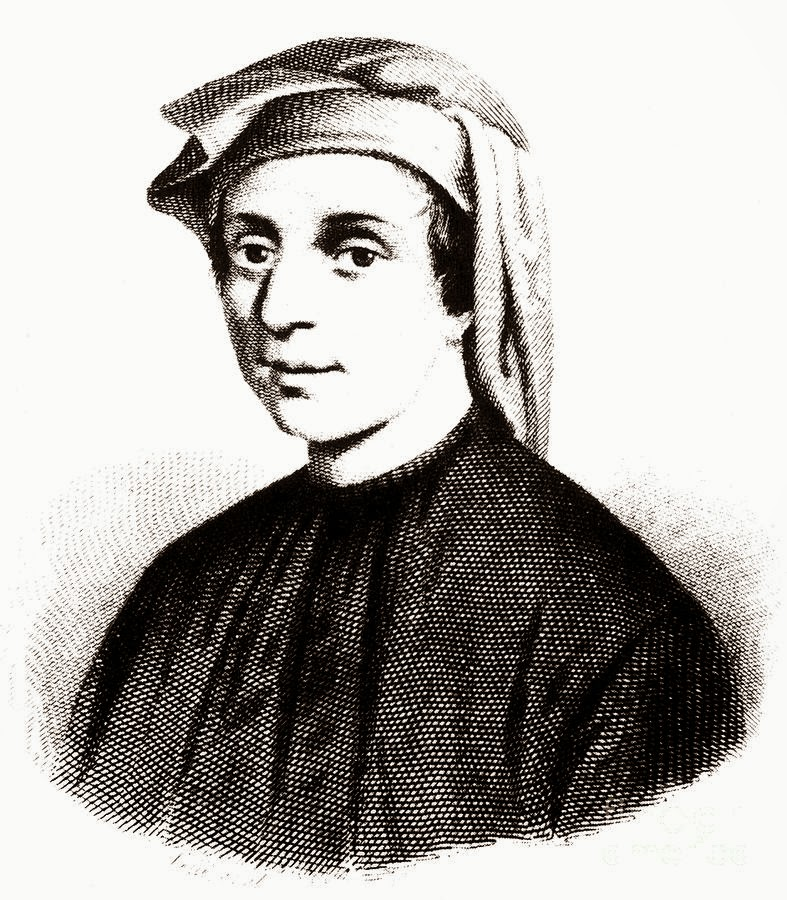
Leonardo Fibonacci, referred to as "the most talented Western mathematician of the Middle Ages"

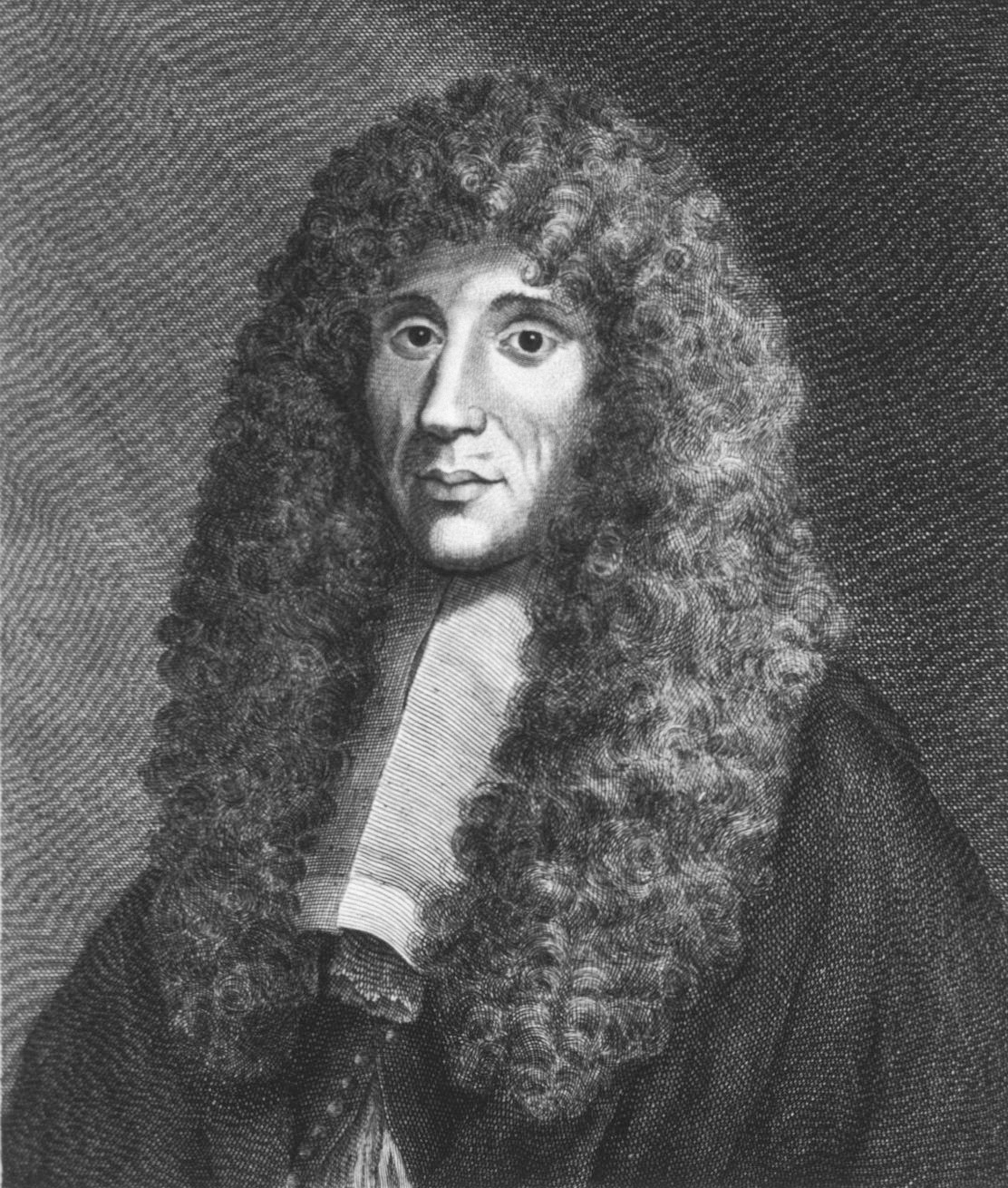
Francesco Redi, the founder of experimental biology, is referred to as the father of modern parasitology.

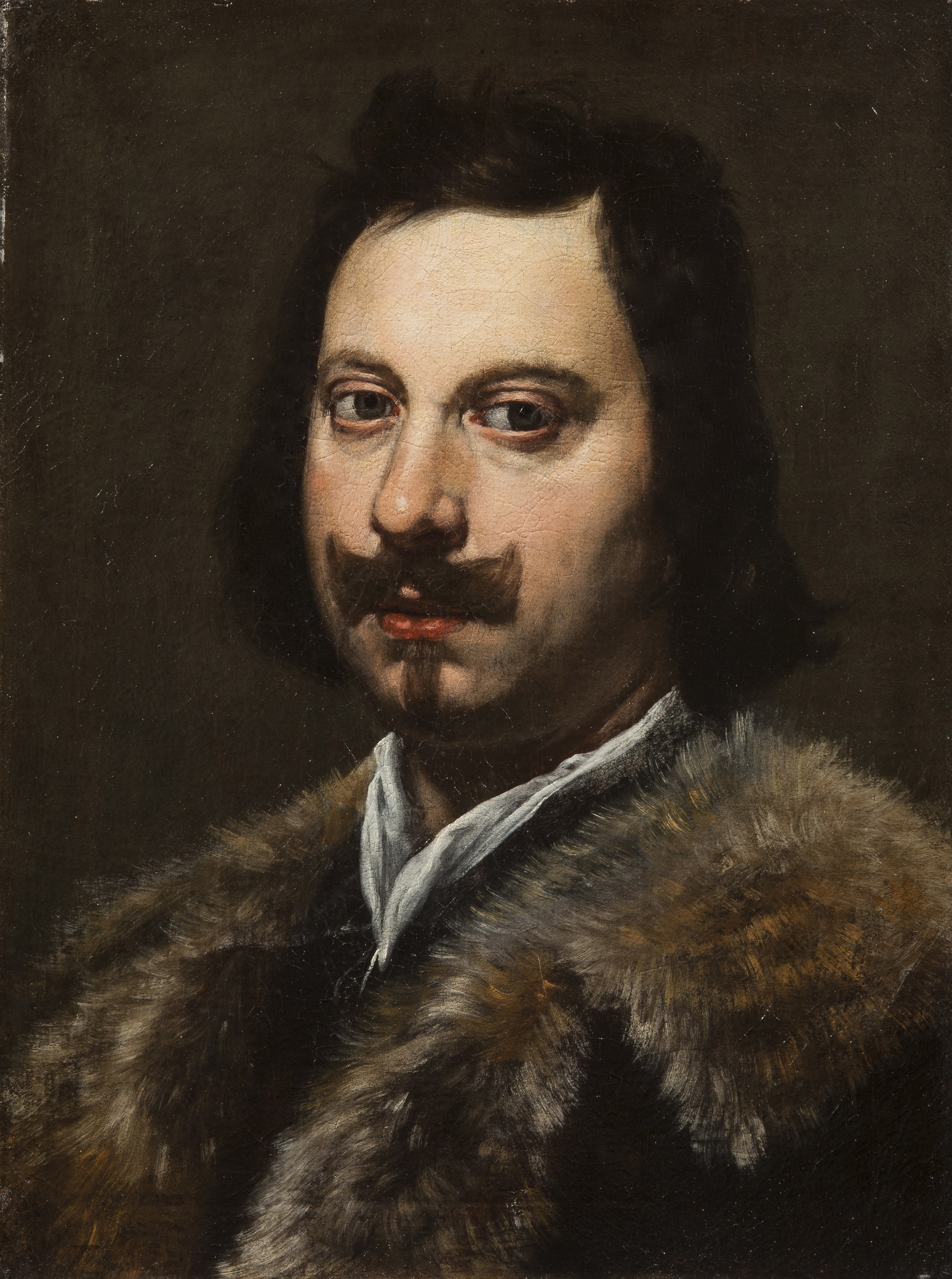
Evangelista Torricelli, the inventor of barometer, made various advances in optics and work on the method of indivisibles.

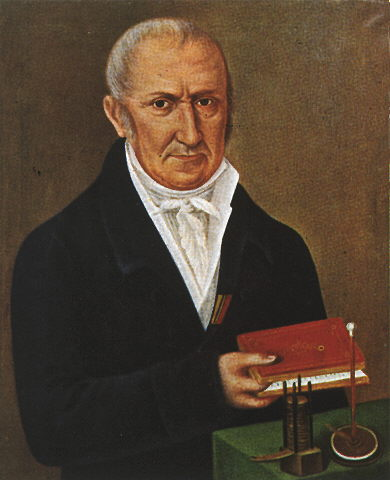
Alessandro Volta, the inventor of the electrical battery and discover of methane, and did substantial work with electric currents

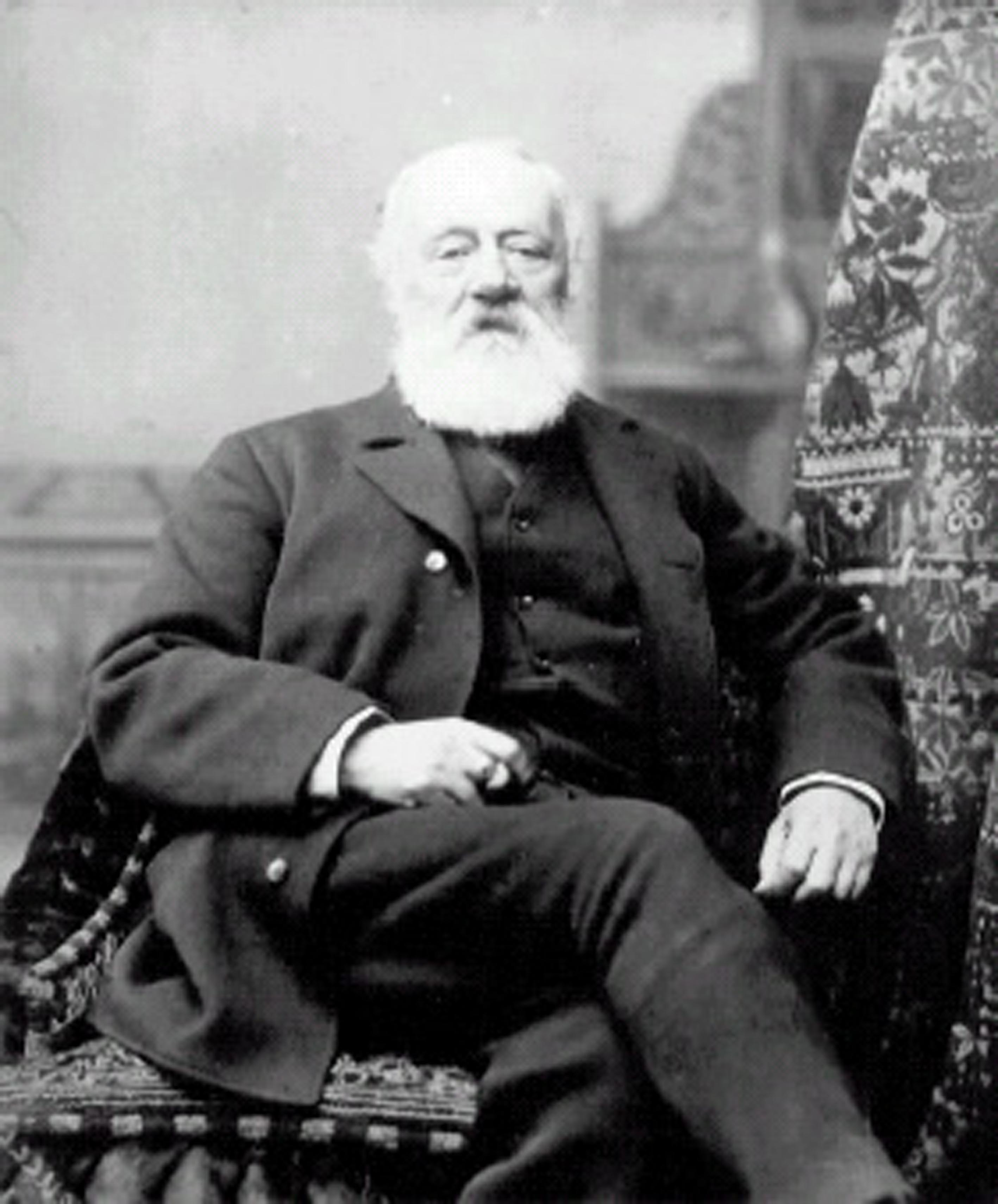
Antonio Meucci developed a voice-communication apparatus that several sources credit as the first telephone

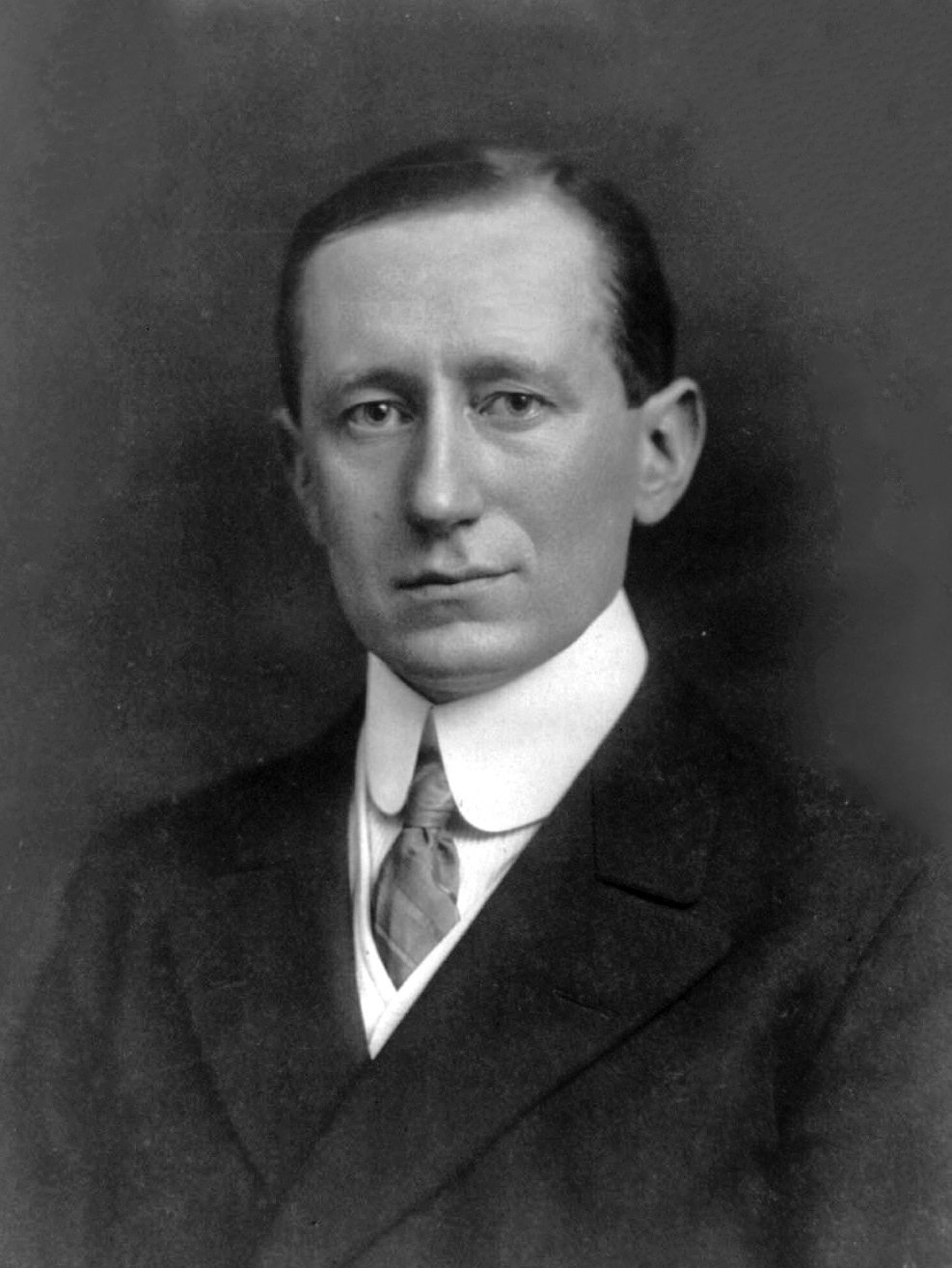
Guglielmo Marconi, inventor of the radio and the father of the wireless communication

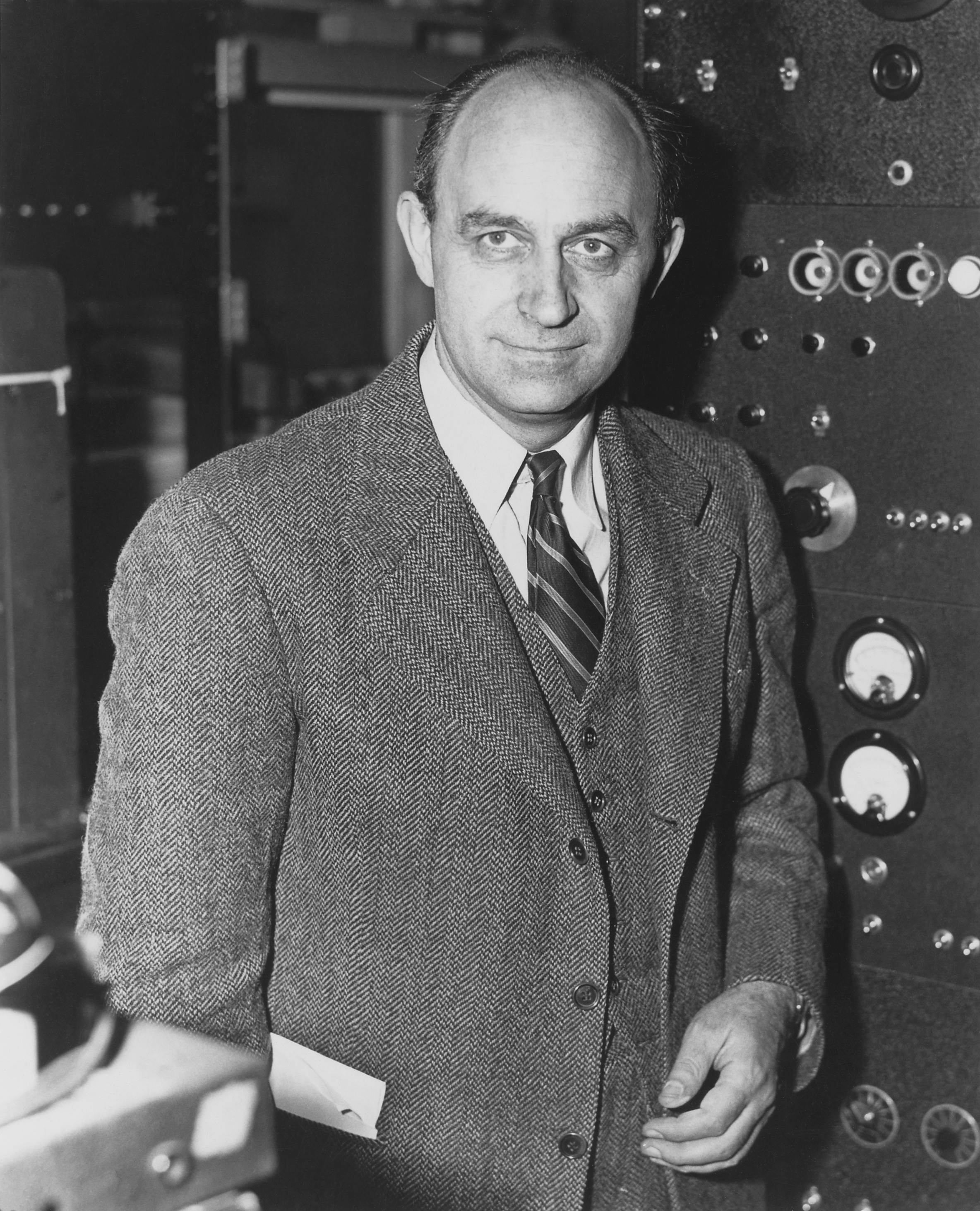
Enrico Fermi, creator of the world's first nuclear reactor.

Through the centuries, Italy has fostered the scientific community that produced many major discoveries in physics and the other sciences. During the Renaissance Italian polymaths such as Leonardo da Vinci (1452–1519), Michelangelo (1475–1564) and Leon Battista Alberti (1404–1472) made contributions in a variety of fields, including biology, architecture, and engineering. Galileo Galilei (1564–1642), an astronomer, physicist, engineer, and polymath, played a major role in the Scientific Revolution. He is considered the "father" of observational astronomy, modern physics, the scientific method, modern science.

Other astronomers such as Giovanni Domenico Cassini (1625–1712) and Giovanni Schiaparelli (1835–1910) made discoveries about the Solar System. In mathematics, Joseph Louis Lagrange (born Giuseppe Lodovico Lagrangia, 1736–1813) was active before leaving Italy. Fibonacci (c. 1170 – c. 1250), and Gerolamo Cardano (1501–1576) made fundamental advances in mathematics. Luca Pacioli established accounting to the world. Physicist Enrico Fermi (1901–1954), a Nobel prize laureate, led the team in Chicago that developed the first nuclear reactor. He is considered the "architect of the nuclear age" and the "architect of the atomic bomb". He, Emilio G. Segrè (1905–1989) who discovered the elements technetium and astatine, and the antiproton), Bruno Rossi (1905–1993) a pioneer in Cosmic Rays and X-ray astronomy) and a number of Italian physicists were forced to leave Italy in the 1930s by Fascist laws against Jews.

Other prominent physicists include Amedeo Avogadro (most noted for his contributions to molecular theory, in particular the Avogadro's law and the Avogadro constant), Evangelista Torricelli (inventor of barometer), Alessandro Volta (inventor of electric battery), Guglielmo Marconi (inventor of radio), Galileo Ferraris and Antonio Pacinotti, pioneers of the induction motor, Alessandro Cruto, pioneer of light bulb and Innocenzo Manzetti, eclectic pioneer of auto and robotics, Ettore Majorana (who discovered the Majorana fermions), Carlo Rubbia (1984 Nobel Prize in Physics for work leading to the discovery of the W and Z particles at CERN). Antonio Meucci is known for developing a voice-communication device which is often credited as the first telephone.

Pier Giorgio Perotto in 1964 designed one of the first desktop programmable calculators, the Programma 101. In biology, Francesco Redi has been the first to challenge the theory of spontaneous generation by demonstrating that maggots come from eggs of flies and he described 180 parasites in details and Marcello Malpighi founded microscopic anatomy, Lazzaro Spallanzani conducted research in bodily functions, animal reproduction, and cellular theory, Camillo Golgi, whose many achievements include the discovery of the Golgi complex, paved the way to the acceptance of the Neuron doctrine, Rita Levi-Montalcini discovered the nerve growth factor (awarded 1986 Nobel Prize in Physiology or Medicine). In chemistry, Giulio Natta received the Nobel Prize in Chemistry in 1963 for his work on high polymers. Giuseppe Occhialini received the Wolf Prize in Physics for the discovery of the pion or pi-meson decay in 1947. Ennio De Giorgi, a Wolf Prize in Mathematics recipient in 1990, solved Bernstein's problem about minimal surfaces and the 19th Hilbert problem on the regularity of solutions of Elliptic partial differential equations.

== Nobel Prizes ==
Swiss Nobel laureates
Year	Image	Laureate	Born	Died	Field	Rationale
1906	Portrait of Camillo Golgi	Camillo Golgi	7 July 1843 in Corteno	21 January 1926 in Pavia	Physiology or Medicine	"in recognition of their work on the structure of the nervous system" prize shared with Santiago Ramón y Cajal
1909	Portrait of Guglielmo Marconi	Guglielmo Marconi	25 April 1874 in Bologna	20 July 1937 in Rome	Physics	"in recognition of their contributions to the development of wireless telegraphy" prize shared with Karl Ferdinand Braun
1938	Portrait of Enrico Fermi	Enrico Fermi	29 September 1901 in Rome since 1944 also American citizen	28 November 1954 in Chicago, US	Physics	"for his demonstrations of the existence of new radioactive elements produced by neutron irradiation, and for his related discovery of nuclear reactions brought about by slow neutrons"
1957	Portrait of Daniel Bovet	Daniel Bovet	23 March 1907 in Neuchâtel, Switzerland acquired Italian citizenship in 1947 or 1948	8 April 1992 in Rome	Physiology or Medicine	"for his discoveries relating to synthetic compounds that inhibit the action of certain body substances, and especially their action on the vascular system and the skeletal muscles"
1959	Portrait of Emilio Segrè	Emilio Segrè	1 February 1905 in Tivoli since 1944 also American citizen	22 April 1989 in Lafayette, US	Physics	"for their discovery of the antiproton" prize shared with Owen Chamberlain
1963	Portrait of Giulio Natta	Giulio Natta	26 February 1903 in Imperia	2 May 1979 in Bergamo	Chemistry	"for their discoveries in the field of the chemistry and technology of high polymers" prize shared with Karl Ziegler
1969	Portrait of Salvador Luria	Salvador Luria	13 August 1912 in Turin since 1947 also American citizen	6 February 1991 in Lexington, US	Physiology or Medicine	"for their discoveries concerning the replication mechanism and the genetic structure of viruses" prize shared with Max Delbrück and Alfred D. Hershey
1975	Portrait of Renato Dulbecco	Renato Dulbecco	22 February 1914 in Catanzaro since 1953 also American citizen	19 February 2012 in La Jolla, US	Physiology or Medicine	"for their discoveries concerning the interaction between tumour viruses and the genetic material of the cell" prize shared with David Baltimore and Howard Martin Temin
1984	Portrait of Carlo Rubbia	Carlo Rubbia	31 March 1934 in Gorizia	—	Physics	"for their decisive contributions to the large project, which led to the discovery of the field particles W and Z, communicators of weak interaction" prize shared with Simon van der Meer
1986	Portrait of Rita Levi-Montalcini	Rita Levi-Montalcini	22 April 1909 in Turin	30 December 2012 in Rome	Physiology or Medicine	"for their discoveries of growth factors" prize shared with Stanley Cohen
2002	Portrait of Riccardo Giacconi	Riccardo Giacconi	6 October 1931 in Genoa since 1960 also American citizen	16 December 2018 in La Jolla	Physics	"for pioneering contributions to astrophysics, which have led to the discovery of cosmic X-ray sources" prize shared with Raymond Davis Jr. and Masatoshi Koshiba
2007	Portrait of Mario Capecchi	Mario Capecchi	6 October 1937 in Verona later naturalized American	—	Physiology or Medicine	"for their discoveries of principles for introducing specific gene modifications in mice by the use of embryonic stem cells" prize shared with Martin J. Evans and Oliver Smithies
2021	Portrait of Giorgio Parisi	Giorgio Parisi	4 August 1948 in Rome	—	Physics	"for the discovery of the interplay of disorder and fluctuations in physical systems from atomic to planetary scales" prize shared with Syukuro Manabe and Klaus Hasselmann

== See also ==
- Internet in Italy
- Telecommunications in Italy
- List of Italian inventions
- Roman technology
