= Pico =

Pico may refer to:

== Places ==
=== The Moon ===
- Mons Pico, a lunar mountain in the northern part of the Mare Imbrium basin

=== Portugal ===
- Pico, a civil parish in the municipality of Vila Verde
- Pico da Pedra, a civil parish in the municipality of Ribeira Grande, São Miguel, Azores
- Pico Island, the largest island in the Central Group of the Azores archipelago
- Mount Pico (Montanha do Pico), the distinctive stratovolcano that stands on the island of Pico
- Pico da Vara, the highest mountain on the island of São Miguel, Azores

=== United States ===
- M. Pico Building, a building in Lafayette County, Florida
- PICO Building (Sanford, Florida)
- Camp Pico Blanco, a summer camp in Monterey County, California
- Pico Mountain, a ski resort in Rutland County, Vermont
- Pico Boulevard, a major street in Los Angeles, California
- Pico-Union, Los Angeles, a neighborhood in Los Angeles
- Pico, California, an unincorporated community now part of Pico Rivera, California
- Pico School District, now part of the Whittier City School District

=== Elsewhere ===
- General Pico, a city in the Province of La Pampa, Argentina
- Pico da Neblina, a mountain in the State of Amazonas, Brazil
- Pico de Orizaba, a volcano on the borders of Puebla State and Veracruz State, Mexico
- Pico do Fogo, a volcano on the island of Fogo, Cape Verde
- Pico, Lazio, a comune in the Province of Frosinone, Italy
- Pico Paraná, a mountain in the State of Paraná, Brazil
- Río Pico, Chubut, a village in the Province of Chubut, Argentina

== People ==
- Giovanni Pico della Mirandola (1463–1494), Italian philosopher
- Pío Pico (1801–1894), Mexican politician
- Andrés Pico (1810–1876), Mexican general
- Salomon Pico (1821–1860), Mexican soldier, Californio Bandit
- Pico Iyer (born 1957), British writer
- Jeff Pico (born 1966), American baseball player
- Sol Picó (born 1967), Spanish dancer and choreographer
- Anderson Pico (born 1988), Brazilian football player
- Pico (footballer) (born 1988), Spanish footballer
- Pico (Cape Verdean footballer) (born 1992), Irish-Cape Verdean footballer
- Aaron Pico (born 1996), mixed martial artist, wrestler
- Andres G. Pico, American politician

== Fictional characters ==
- Pico, a Newgrounds character created by Tom Fulp that debuted in the Flash game Pico's School
- Pico, a character created by American comedy duo The Jerky Boys
- Pico de Paperis, an Italian name for Ludwig Von Drake, a character in the American Walt Disney cartoon series
- Pico, the eponymous character of the hentai anime Boku no Pico
- Pico West, a character in the animated web series MechWest

== Science and medicine ==
- pico-, a metric prefix denoting a factor of 10^{−12}
- PICO dark matter experiment
- PICO process, a medical technique to frame and answer a clinical question

== Computing and electronics ==
- Pico (text editor), a simple text editor
- Pico (supercomputer), an IBM supercomputer
- Sega Pico, a video game system designed for young children
- Pico-8, a fantasy console and friendly game-making software
- Pico projector, a handheld projector
- Raspberry Pi Pico, a microcontroller
- PICO (company), a virtual reality headset company owned by ByteDance
  - PICO Neo 3, a virtual reality headset released in 2021
  - PICO 4, a virtual reality headset released in 2022

== Other uses ==
- Beretta Pico, a small, semi-automatic pistol manufactured in the United States by Beretta
- Laser Pico, a small sailing dinghy
- Pico de gallo, a salsa made from fresh vegetables, especially tomatoes, onions, and peppers
- PICO National Network, a U.S. religious training organization
- Island Trees School District v. Pico, a U.S. legal case
- Pico (mango), a mango cultivar from the Philippines

== See also ==
- Pica (disambiguation)
- Pico Agudo (disambiguation)
- Picco (disambiguation)
- Picus (disambiguation)
- Piko (disambiguation)
- Picon (disambiguation)
- Picone (disambiguation)
