= Pika (disambiguation) =

A pika is a small mammal of the genus Ochotona.

Pika may also refer to:

== People ==
- Heliodor Píka (1897–1949), Czechoslovak army officer
- Pika Danylo (1901–1941), Ukrainian bandura player
- Hikaru Minegishi (born 1991), nicknamed Pika, Filipino footballer

== Vehicles ==
- GAF Pika, manually operated prototype of the GAF Jindivik, a target drone of Australia
- Isuzu Pika, a Japanese light truck
- JMC Pika, a midsized pickup truck for the Chinese market

== Places ==
- Pika Lake, a body of water of the Pika River in Lac-Achouakan, Quebec, Canada
- Pika River, a tributary of the Pikauba River, flowing in Saguenay–Lac-Saint-Jean, Quebec, Canada
- Pika Peak, a mountain in Banff National Park in Alberta, Canada

== Other uses ==
- Pika (subgenus), a subgenus of the genus Ochotona, a.k.a. the Pika Pika
- Pikachu, a Pokémon who speaks only one word, pikachu, frequently clipped to pika and as a doublet pikapika
- Pika Édition, a manga publisher from France
- PIKA Industrial Woodworking School, Semarang, Indonesia
- TV Pika, a Slovenian TV show

== See also ==
- Pika pika (disambiguation)
- Pica (disambiguation)
- PICA (disambiguation)
- Pico (disambiguation)
- Piko (disambiguation)
