= Pika pika =

Pika pika or pikapika may refer to:

== Music ==
- "Pika Pika", a 2018 song by Steve Aoki, see Steve Aoki discography
- "Pika Pika" (Japanese: ピカピカ, romanized: pikapika, lit. 'glitter'), a 1999 song by Makoto Kawamoto

== Characters ==
- Pikachu, a Pokémon who speaks only one word, pikachu, frequently clipped to pika and as a doublet pikapika
- Pikapika, a fictional character from Samurai Pizza Cats, see List of Samurai Pizza Cats characters

== Other uses ==
- Pika, a subgenus of the mammal genus Ochotona (also known as the Pika pika), native to montane regions in North America and Asia

== See also ==
- Pika (disambiguation)
- Pika Pika Fantajin (Japanese: ピカピカふぁんたじん), 2014 album by Kyary Pamyu Pamyu (Japanese: きゃりーぱみゅぱみゅ)
- Pica pica, a bird species known commonly as the Eurasian magpie
- Yamataka Eye, a Japanese DJ, also known as DJ Pica Pica Pica
- Pica (disambiguation)
- PICA (disambiguation)
