= Picone =

Picone may refer to:

== Surname ==
- Vito Picone (born 1941), the lead singer of The Elegants
- Mauro Picone (1885–1977), Italian mathematician
- Jack Picone (born 1958), Australian-born documentary photographer, photojournalist, author, festival/collective founder, tutor and academic
- Mario Picone (1926–2013), Italian American pitcher in Major League Baseball
- Giuseppe Picone (born 1976), Italian principal ballet dancer, choreographer, artistic director
- Simon Picone (born 1982), Italian rugby union player

== Mathematics - Ordinary differential equations ==
- Picone identity, a classical result about homogeneous linear second order differential equations
- Sturm–Picone comparison theorem, a classical theorem which provides criteria for the oscillation and non-oscillation of solutions of certain linear differential equations in the real domain

== Other uses ==
- Ficarra e Picone, an Italian comedy duo
- Where's Picone?, a 1983 Italian comedy film

== See also ==
- Picon (disambiguation)
- Pico (disambiguation)
