= Cilea =

Cilea or CILEA may refer to:

- Consorzio Interuniversitario Lombardo per l'Elaborazione Automatica, academic consortium in Italy
- Francesco Cilea (1866–1950), Italian composer
