= Villa Farragiana a Meina =

Villa Farragiana
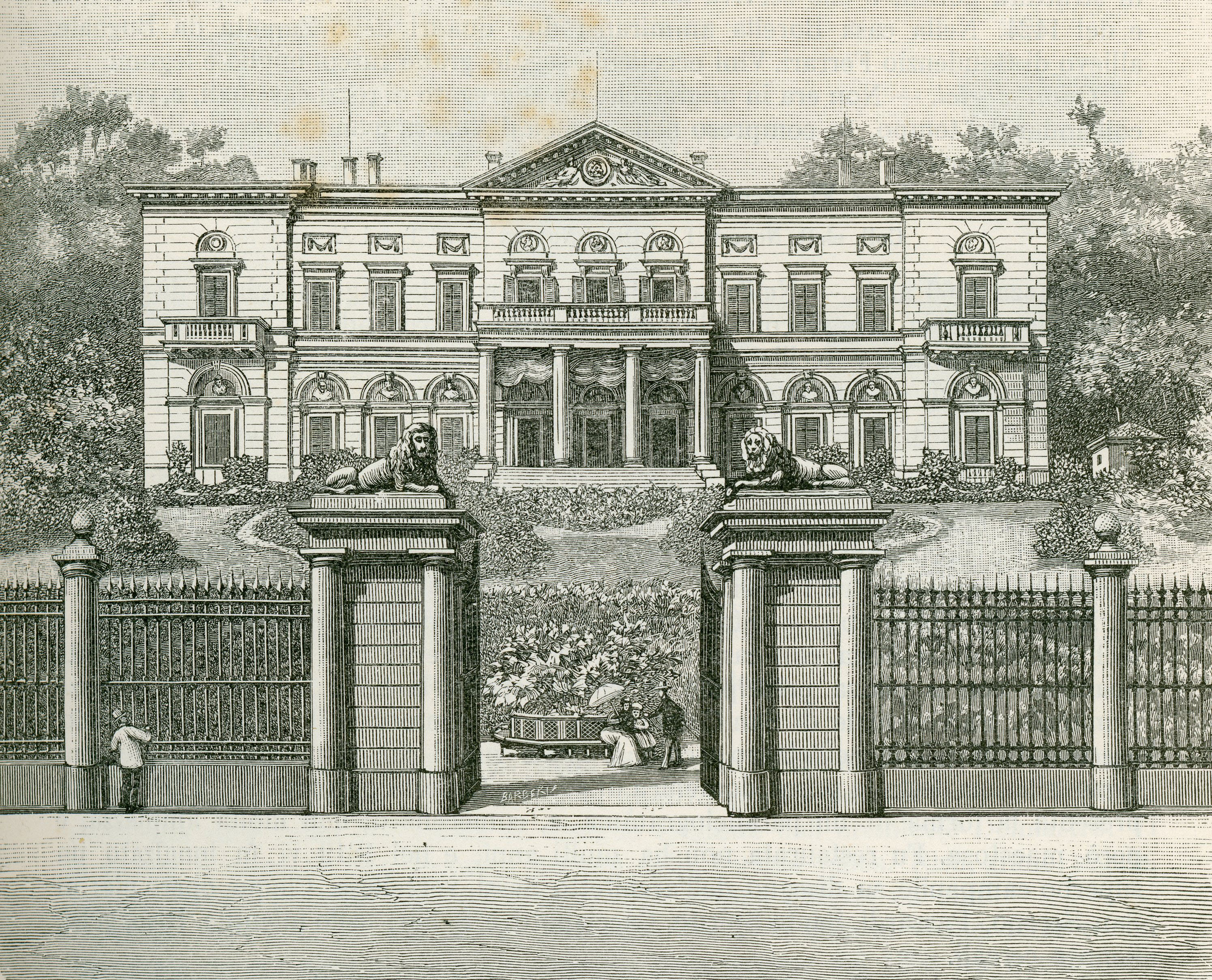
- 1890 xylography of the villa
- Click on the map for a fullscreen view

General information
- Location: Meina, Italy
- Coordinates: 45.78207°N 8.54108°E

The Villa Farragiana a Meina is a 19th-century Neoclassical-style rural palace located on the shores of Lago Maggiore, between the towns of Meina and Arona in the Province of Novara, region of Piedmont, Italy. This villa differs from the Villa Faraggiana at Albissola Marina in the Province of Savona.

== History ==
Construction of the villa began in 1855 by Alessandro Farragiana, based on designs by Antonio Bussero. In the past, the villa and the grounds housed an eclectic collection of live and stuffed animals collected by Alessandro the younger, son of the former Alessandro's son, Italian senator Raffaello Faraggiana. These exhibits are now displayed at the Museum di Storia Naturale Faraggiana Ferrandi (Faraggiana Ferrandi Museum of Natural History) in Novara.

In 1949, the building was donated by the remnants of the family to the monastic order of Poverelle from Bergamo. The nuns use the site as an orphanage and hospice.

== Description ==
The classic facade faces the lake: the centre has a protruding colonnaded portico with a balcony and a grand wide staircase. Below, adjacent to the street, are gates with crouching lion statues on pillars. Above the windows are eleven medallions with reliefs of illustrious Italians sculpted by Giosuè Argenti. The tympanum has an allegorical depiction of Fame. The villa is surrounded by ample gardens with exotic flora.
