= Picco (surname) =

Picco is a surname. Notable people with the surname include:

- Costanzo Picco (1917–2009), Italian military officer and skier
- Ed Picco (born 1961), Canadian Nunavut politician
- Franco Picco (born 1955), former Italian rally raid biker
- Giandomenico Picco (1948–2024), Italian diplomat and former United Nations Assistant Secretary-General for Political Affairs
- Leonel Picco (born 1998), Argentine professional footballer
- Leonello Picco (1876–1921), Italian entomologist
- Maria Angela Picco (1867–1921), Italian Roman Catholic professed religious
- Pierre Picco (born 1988), French slalom canoer

== See also ==
- Picco (disambiguation)
