= Pica =

Pica or PICA may refer to:

== Biology ==
- Pica (disorder), an abnormal appetite for earth and other non-foods
- Posterior inferior cerebellar artery, a major artery supplying blood to the cerebellum

=== Organisms ===
- Aechmea 'Pica', a cultivar of the flowering plant Aechmea recurvata
- Pica (bird), a genus of magpies
- Pika, a small mammal (archaic spelling "pica")

== Organizations ==
- OCLC PICA, a library automation company
- Palestine Jewish Colonization Association, known by its Yiddish acronym as PICA
- Pennsylvania Intergovernmental Cooperation Authority, a governmental agency in Philadelphia, Pennsylvania
- Perth Institute of Contemporary Arts, Western Australia
- Pica Press, a publishing imprint
- Pittsburgh Intergovernmental Cooperation Authority, a governmental agency in Pittsburgh, Pennsylvania
- Portland Institute for Contemporary Art, Oregon

== People ==
- Amalia Pica (born 1978), Argentine artist
- Antonio Pica (1923–2014), Spanish actor
- Joe Pica (1923–1973), American pianist
- Pierre Pica (born 1951), French linguist
- Teresa P. Pica (1945–2011), American educator
- Tina Pica (1884–1968), Italian actress
- Yamantaka Eye (born 1964), Japanese artist known as DJ Pica Pica Pica (DJ 光光光)

== Places ==
- Pica, Chile, an oasis town in the Atacama Desert of Chile
  - Limón de Pica, a lime variety from Pica
- Pica, Cumbria, a village in northwest England
- Pica, Jayuya, Puerto Rico, a barrio

== Technology ==
- Acer PICA, a system logic chipset introduced in 1993
- Phenolic-impregnated carbon ablator, a spacecraft heat shield material
- Pre-integrated COF APM, part of the International Space Station's Columbus module systems

== Other uses ==
- Pica, an alternative name for the grape Merille
- Pica, a lance used by a picador in bullfighting
- Pica (unit), a unit of length used in typesetting and document layout
- Pica (type), the ten-characters-per-inch font used by many typewriters
- Pica, a traditional point-size name in US usage
- píča, a rude expression for a vagina in the Czech Republic and Slovakia

== See also ==
- Pico (disambiguation)
- Piga (disambiguation)
- Pika (disambiguation)
