= Picco =

Picco is an Italian word and surname meaning "summit" or "peak", it may refer to:

== Mountains ==
At least two mountains in the Swiss-Italian Alps have this name:

- Picco Luigi Amedeo, a mountain on the Brouillard ridge to the summit of Mont Blanc
- Picco Muzio, a mountain below the Matterhorn

== Other ==
- Picco (surname), surname
- Picco (film), a 2010 German film
- Picco pipe, a minute woodwind
- Stadio Alberto Picco, a football stadium in La Spezia, Italy
- Picco 1, a German make of dumper with one rear wheel in the midline
- PiCCO — pulse contour cardiac output, medical device for monitoring cardiac output
- Picco Studio, a photography studio

== See also ==
- Pico (disambiguation)
