= Piga =

Piga or PIGA may refer to:

== People ==
- Aldo Piga (1928–1994), Italian composer
- Gustavo Piga (born 1964), Italian economist

== Other uses ==
- PIGA, an enzyme
- PIGA accelerometer, a type of accelerometer mainly used in Inertial Navigation Systems
- Piga (grape), an Italian wine grape
- Piqa or Cerro Piga, a mountain in the Andes on the border of Bolivia and Chile

== See also ==
- Pica (disambiguation)
