= Pico (footballer) =

Spanish footballer

Personal information
- Full name: Juan Jesús Piñero Bolarín
- Date of birth: 13 July 1988 (age 38)
- Place of birth: Mula, Spain
- Height: 1.81 m (5 ft 11 in)
- Position: Forward

Team information
- Current team: Atlético Pulpileño

Youth career
- 1999–2006: Murcia

Senior career*
Years	Team	Apps	(Gls)
2006–2010	Murcia	8	(1)
2007–2010	Murcia B	76	(15)
2008	→ Ibiza-Eivissa (loan)	15	(1)
2010–2011	Getafe B	32	(0)
2011–2012	Caravaca	33	(3)
2012–2015	UCAM Murcia	77	(8)
2015	Orihuela	14	(6)
2015–2017	Lorca Deportiva	62	(16)
2017–2019	Jaén	29	(2)
2019–	Atlético Pulpileño	33	(7)
- * Club domestic league appearances and goals as of 13 October 2019

Juan Jesús Piñero Bolarín (born 13 July 1988), known as Pico, is a Spanish footballer who plays for CA Pulpileño as a forward.

== Football career ==
Born in Mula, Region of Murcia, Pico was a product of local Real Murcia's youth system. On 17 June 2006, before even having appeared for the reserves, he made his professional debut, coming on as a substitute for Samuel in the 62nd minute of a 1–1 away draw against Sporting de Gijón in the Segunda División.

Pico was later assigned to the B-side in the Tercera División, and was loaned to UD Ibiza-Eivissa on 29 January 2008, until June. He subsequently returned to his parent club, and alternated between the reserves and the first team during his spell, scoring a goal for the latter on 20 June 2009 in a 1–2 loss at Córdoba CF.

Pico left Murcia in summer 2010 and joined another reserve team, Getafe CF B of the Segunda División B. He subsequently resumed his career in the same level but also in the fourth tier, representing Caravaca CF, UCAM Murcia CF, Orihuela CF, CF Lorca Deportiva and Real Jaén.
