= Picus (disambiguation) =

Picus may refer to:

- Picus, a man turned into a woodpecker by Circe in Greek and Roman mythology
- Picus (bird), a genus of birds in the woodpecker family
- Picus, a village in Ochiul Roş Commune, Anenii Noi district, Moldova
- Sue Picus, American bridge player
- PICUS, pilot in command under supervision
