= Joe Pica =

Joe Pica (September 19, 1923 – December 13, 1973), nicknamed "The Wizard of the Keys," was a popular United States East Coast pianist and lounge singer who flourished in the 1950s.

== Life and work ==
A native of New Jersey, Joseph Pica was the son of James Pica, a tailor, who had immigrated from Italy in 1899, and his wife Safira, who had been born in the U.S. but was of Italian descent. Joseph was the youngest of four siblings.

He may have graduated from Abington Avenue Elementary School in Newark, New Jersey, and attended Barringer High School, also in Newark. According to one source, "At the age of nine he presented two successful classical concerts but in his early teens he switched from classical to pop style."

For thirteen years, Pica had his own radio show on WAAT in Newark. To promote The Jolson Story (1946), a theater owner in Newark hired Pica to play Jolson songs on the radio for three weeks prior to the film's debut. Free tickets were given to those who could guess the names of the songs.

In the 1950s, Pica recorded more than a dozen singles and at least one album, all issued by either Original Records or Bergen Records in Little Ferry, New Jersey or Anchor Records in Newark. Four of his records made the Music Vendor pop charts, 1954–58.

In about 1960, by that time married to Eva, Pica moved to Florida, where he played piano at the Crystal Lounge in Clearwater before becoming the owner of Joe Pica Red Carpet Steak House and Lounge.

He died in 1973, shortly after his 50th birthday.

Joe Pica the pianist is sometimes confused with Joe Picca (1919–1979) who had an accordion shop in Bound Brook, New Jersey, and composed piano accordion solos.

== Personal recollections of Pica ==
Joe Pica played at the Three Acre Grill in Rutherford NJ late forties to early fifties. Twice a week there were guest singers, one of which was Terry Amadio, a close friend of mine. Dom Cerrito was owner of the grill. I made records on 45 disks of Joe Pica for people that requested a song. the records were given free ... People kept coming back. I also made some of Joe with Terry Amadio singing. I lost contact with her when I was drafted into the Army in August 1951 and sadly she was engaged to be married soon after I was discharged from the Active Army in July 1953. I don't think she continued singing much longer. What a shame because she was one of the best but I don't think she believed in herself as much as she should have.

Had she not married and we continued our friendship I know I could have helped her to get to the right people that would have brought her to national and possibly international fame.

To me Joe Pica was the best piano player and Terry Amadio was the very best female singer in my, D. Tony Ciaramella, lifetime.

— D. Tony Ciaramella

Down the Shore in Long Branch, NJ, appearing Friday and Saturday nights at the Kensington Lounge was one of the best piano players I ever heard: Joe Pica, the Wizard of the Keys. He sang and played songs I remembered all of my life: 'Oh How I Miss You Tonight,' 'Go Home, Little Girl, Go Home,' and 'Down in the Schoolyard,' among others. It was in the late '50s, and he brings back many memories.

— Dick Malone

== Discography ==
=== Singles ===
- "Back in the Good Old Days" / "Springtime in the Rockies" (with Shorty Warren and the Arlene Wright Trio) (78 rpm, Trope 5154, c. 1951)
- "Go Home, Little Girl, Go Home" (with The Song Spinners) / "Memories" (45 rpm, Anchor 45-A-6, August 1952)
- "Margie" / "When I Grow Too Old to Dream" (45 rpm, Anchor 45-A-18, 1953)
- "Please Don't Talk About Me When I'm Gone" / "Caravan" (Instrumental) (45 rpm, Original OR-511, c. 1954)
- "The Music Goes 'Round and Around" / "Chinatown, My Chinatown" (Instrumental) (45 rpm, Original OR-512, February 1955)
- "I Learned a Lesson I'll Never Forget" / "Doodle Doo Doo" (with the Balladairs Group) (45 rpm, Original OR-518, 1955)
- "Down in the Old School Yard" / "Oh, How I Miss You Tonight" (45 rpm, Bergen 103, c. 1956)
- "Don't Cry Little Girl, Don't Cry" / "The Woodpecker Song" (Instrumental)(45 rpm, Original OR-532, November 1956)
- "Old Oaken Bucket" / "I'm Always Chasing Rainbows" (45 rpm, Anchor 148, November 1958)
- "When Your Hair Has Turned to Silver" / "You Belong to My Heart" (45 rpm, Anchor 150, c. 1958)
- "Down in the Old School Yard" / "Oh, How I Miss You Tonight" (45 rpm, Anchor 152, c. 1958)
- "Somebody Stole My Girl" / "Oh, How I Miss You Tonight" (45 rpm, Anchor 155, c. 1959)
- "Rocka Rolla Old Pianola" / "You Are My Sunshine" (45 rpm, Anchor 156, c. 1959)
- "Maybe" (Instrumental) / "Yes Sir, That's My Baby" (Instrumental) (45 rpm, Anchor 157, c. 1959)
- "Rock a Rolla the Old Pianola" / "Brother Bill" (Original Records?)

=== Album ===
- Pica on Pianola (33 rpm, Original LP-01) [Track listing: "Somebody Stole My Gal" / "(The Gang that Sang) Heart of My Heart" / "Oh How I Miss You Tonight" / "I Want a Girl" / "Yes, Sir, That's My Baby" / "Five Foot Two, Eyes of Blue" / "Maybe" / "Sweet Sue, Just You"]
