= Faraggiana Ferrandi Natural History Museum =

Natural history museum in Novara, Italy

Coordinates: 45.44901°N 8.62032°E

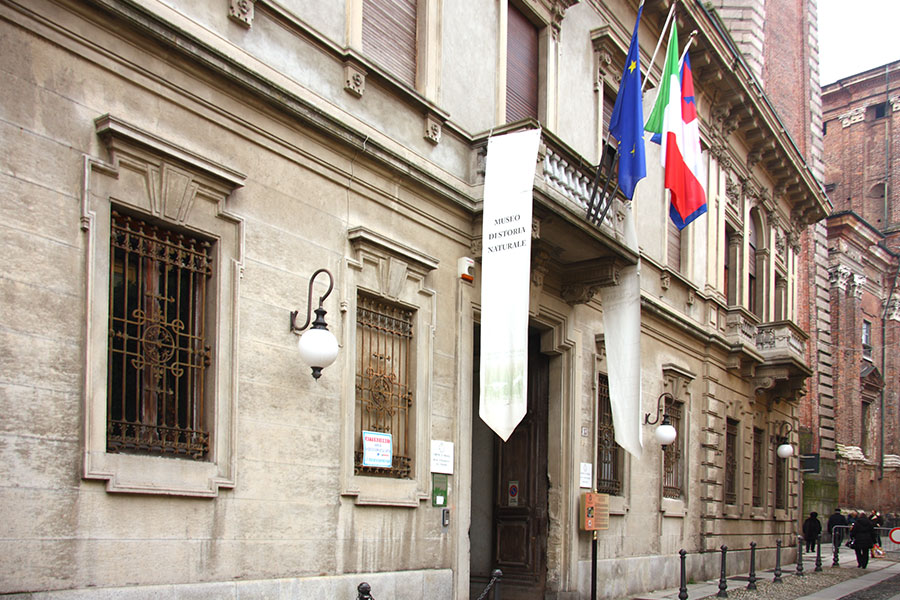

The Faraggiana Ferrandi Natural History Museum is a biological and zoological collection, most of which was collected in the 19th century, and is located in via Gaudenzio Ferrari, in the city of Novara, Piedmont, Italy.

== Collection ==
The exhibits contain some 450 species, mostly taxidermy specimens, along with skulls, hides, and other artefacts. The material was mainly assembled by Catherine Faraggiana Ferrandi, her brother, the explorer Ugo Ferrandi, and her son Alessandro. Catherine and her son maintained exhibits and a zoological park at the Villa Farragiana a Meina. Since 1959, the collections were moved to the Faraggiana Ferrandi palace inside the city and became property of the comune. Further acquisitions have added species from the region of Piedmont to create a natural museum including specimens from the local environment.

Some of the specimens include rare and nearly extinct species, including siamang gibbons, red panda, Amur leopard, snow leopard, and the Berber lion Panthera leo leo, now extinct in the wild.

The museum has twelve rooms, each dedicated to a specific topic:

- Classification and Evolution (from Linnaeus to Darwin);
- Geographic Distribution of Animals;
- Fauna of the Mediterranean maquis;
- Fauna of Africa;
- Fauna of the Poles;
- Fauna of Asia;
- Fauna of Himalayas & Tibet;
- Fauna of Tundra & Taiga;
- Fauna of Woodlands of Piedmont (Deciduous and conifer);
- Fauna of Wetlands of Piedmont;
- Human Environments.
