= PIKA Industrial Woodworking School =

- Indonesian: Pendidikan Industri Kayu

Location
- Imam Bonjol; Semarang, 50139; Indonesia
- Coordinates: 6°58′23.11″S 110°25′0.55″E

Information
- Type: Private vocational secondary school
- Religious affiliation: Catholicism
- Denomination: Jesuit
- Established: 1953; 73 years ago
- Gender: Co-educational
- Website: www.pika-semarang.com

PIKA Industrial Woodworking School (Indonesian: Pendidikan Industri Kayu) is a private Catholic vocational secondary school, located in Semarang, Indonesia. The school was founded in 1953 by the Indonesian Province of the Society of Jesus.

Students at PIKA defray their tuition expenses by a program which integrates education with production of industrial, household, and office furniture. About 75 apprentices graduate each year with a diploma as carpenters, furniture draughtsmen, and furniture designers.

== History ==
On 25 March 1953, Joseph Haeken opened a sawmill and workshop in Kaju Gardens, Kebun Kaju, Indonesia. It produced and repaired wood furniture for churches, monasteries, and schools, employing 23 people. On 30 May 1963 Paul Wiederkehr, from Switzerland, a woodworking expert, came to Fraser Kaju to set up a two-year technical school in woodworking. It was officially established as the Canisius Foundation on 10 November 1968 and called School of Mechanical Gardens Kaju (STKK). Then on 30 July 1971 the name changed from STKK to PIKA (Wood Top Education Industry). PIKA consisted of two phases with the second a production unit, and offered four years of training.

On 5 June 2000 Paul Wiederkehr, handed the direction over to Joko Tarkito with deputy director Warno Tribowo. The school has achieved a wide reputation for woodworking design and ranks among the best in Indonesia.

== See also ==
- Catholic Church in Indonesia
- Education in Indonesia
- List of Jesuit schools
