= CINECA =

Italian non-profit consortium

Coordinates: 44°29′11″N 11°15′35″E

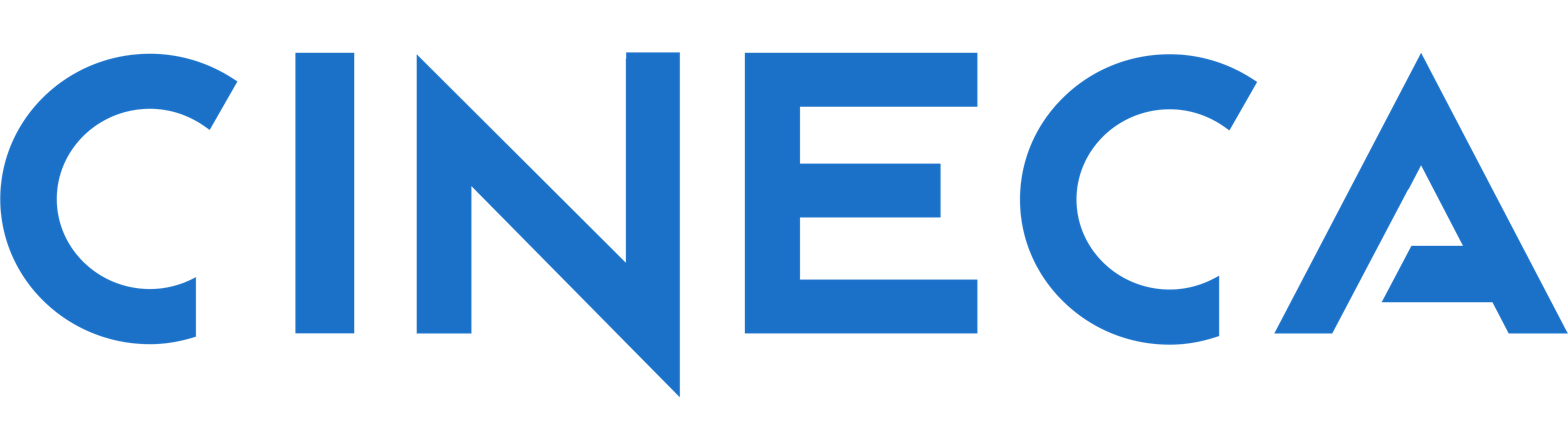
- Formation: July 1967; 58 years ago
- Type: governmental organisation
- Purpose: supercomputing centre for scientific research
- Headquarters: Casalecchio di Reno, Bologna, Italy, EU
- Location: Bologna, Milan, Rome, Naples, Chieti
- Fields: grid computing, bioinformatic, digital content
- Official language: English, Italian
- Staff: 1,030
- Website: www.cineca.it

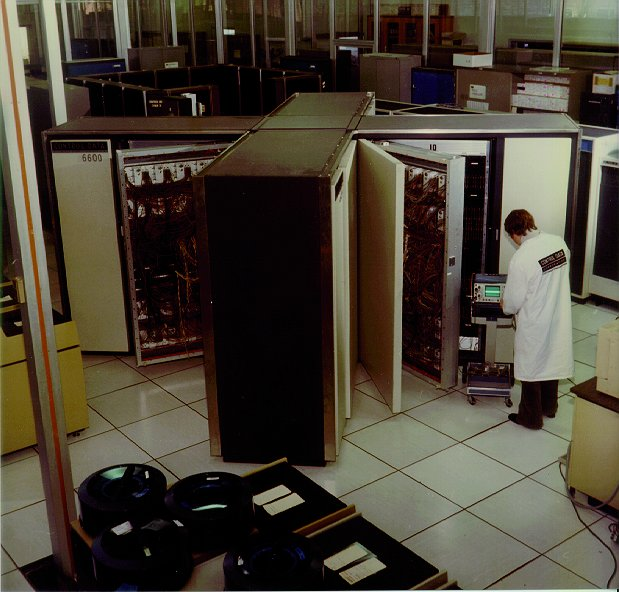
CDC 6600 supercomputer in Cineca (8 January 1970)

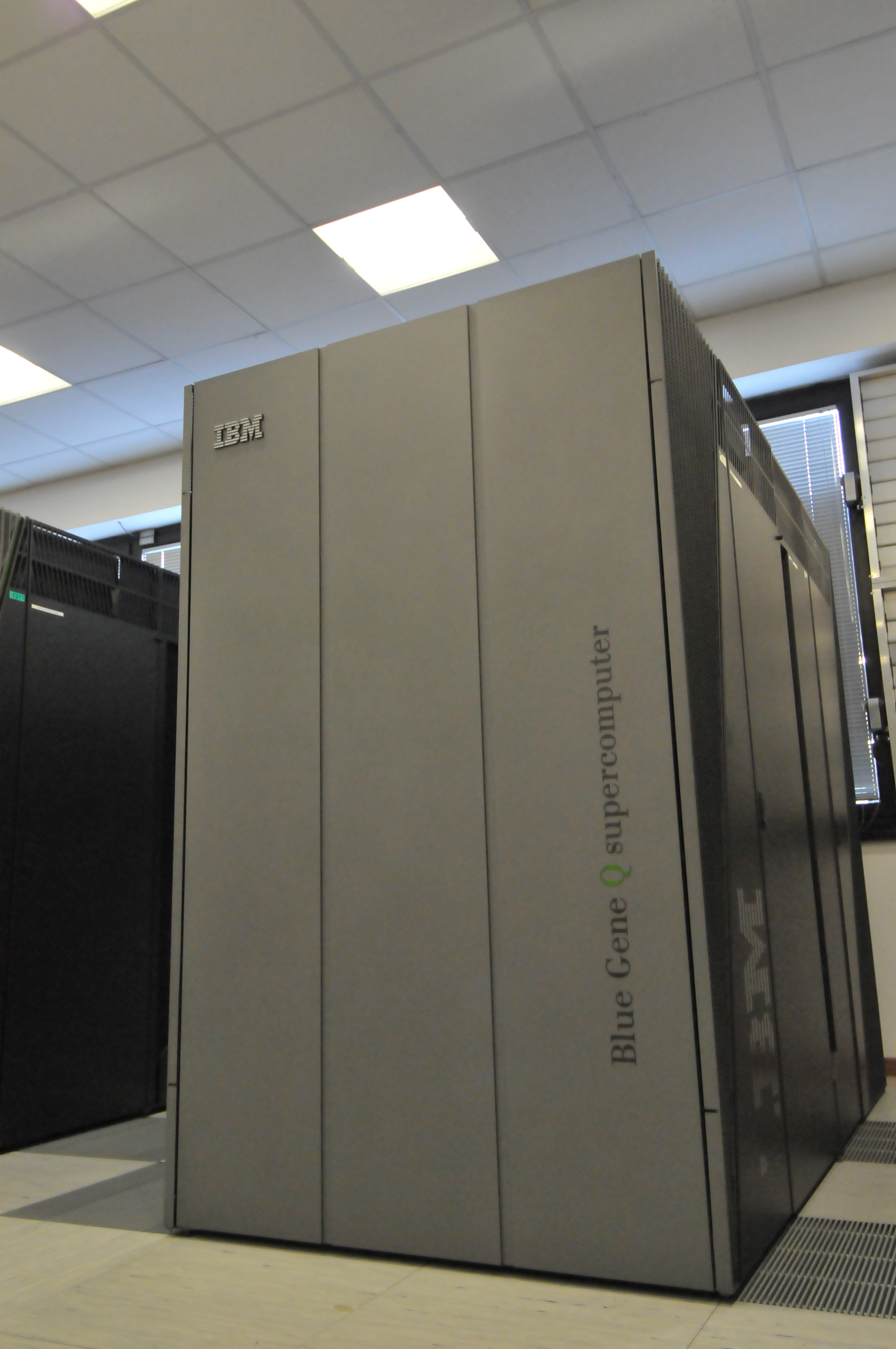
The Fermi IBM Blue Gene/Q supercomputer in Cineca (10 October 2012)

Cineca is a non-profit consortium, made up of 69 Italian universities, 27 national public research centres, the Italian Ministry of Universities and Research (MUR) and the Italian Ministry of Education (MI), and was established in 1969 in Casalecchio di Reno, Bologna.

It is the most powerful supercomputing centre for scientific research in Italy, as stated in the TOP500 list of the most powerful supercomputers in the world: Marconi100, is ranked at the 18th position of the list as of November 2021, with about 30 P/FLOPS.

The consortium's institutional mission is to support the Italian scientific community through supercomputing and scientific visualisation tools. Since the end of the 1980s, Cineca has broadened the scope of its mission by embracing other IT sectors, developing management and administrative services for universities and designing ICT systems for the exchange of information between the MIUR and the Italian national academic system. The consortium is also strongly committed to transfer technology to many categories of users, from public administration to the private enterprises.

Today it merges the specificities and competences of the other two Italian high performance computing consortia, CILEA and Caspur: as a unique reference point for technology innovation in Italy, with its services Cineca supports the whole higher education and research system.

Cineca takes part in several research projects funded by the European Union for the promotion and development of IT technologies (grid computing, bioinformatic, digital content, the promotion of transnational access to European supercomputing centres, etc.).

== Activities ==
It supports the scientific community by means of high performance computing, develops management systems for the university administrations and for the Ministry of Universities and Research, designs and develops information systems for businesses, health care organizations and public administration.

== See also ==
- Fermi (supercomputer)
- Leonardo (supercomputer)
- Pico (supercomputer), the supercomputer installed at CINECA's data center
- Consorzio Interuniversitario Lombardo per l'Elaborazione Automatica, merged into CINECA in 2013
