= Pico (supercomputer) =

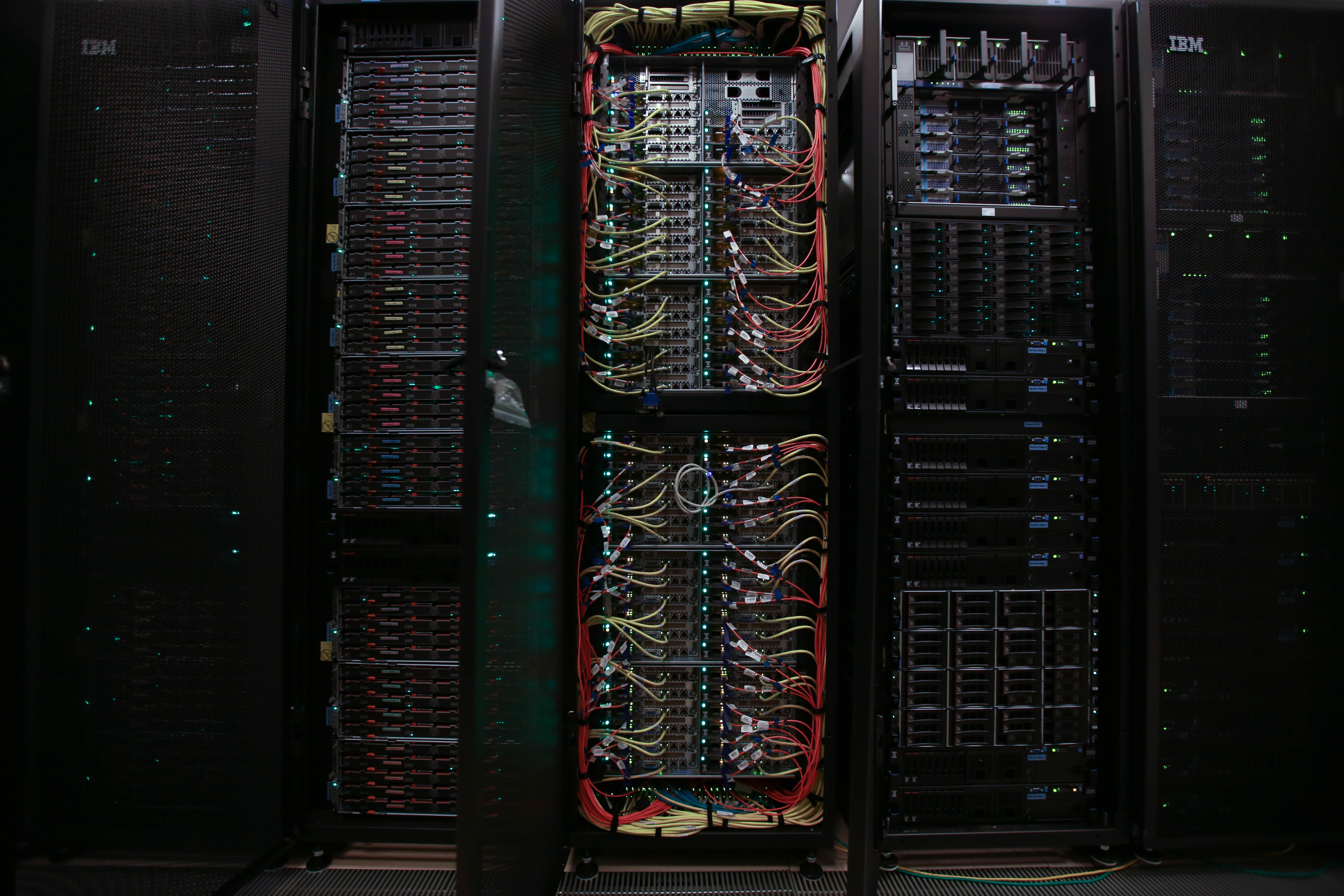
- PICO IBM NeXtScale
- Active: operational 2015
- Sponsors: Ministry of Education, Universities and Research (Italy)
- Operators: The Members of the Consortium
- Location: Cineca, Casalecchio di Reno, Italy
- Architecture: IBM NeXtScale; Linux Infiniband Cluster; Compute/login nodes 66, Intel Xeon E5 2670 v2 #2.5Ghz, 20 cores, 128 GB ram Visualization nodes 2, Intel Xeon E5 2670 v2 # 2.5Ghz, 20 cores, 128 GB Ram, 2 GPU Nvidia K40; Big Mem nodes 2, Intel Xeon E5 2650 v2 # 2.6 GHz, 16 cores, 512 GB Ram,1 GPU Nvidia K20; BigInsight nodes 4, Intel Xeon E5 2650 v2 # 2.6 GHz, 16 cores, 64 GB Ram, 32TB of local disk.
- Memory: 128 GB/Compute node 1080 (2 viz nodes with 512 GB)
- Storage: high throughput disks (based on GSS technology) for a total amount of about 4 PB, connected with a large capacity tape library for a total actual amount of 12 PByte (expandible to 16 PByte).
- Purpose: Big data
- Website: www.hpc.cineca.it/content/pico-user-guide

PICO is an Intel Cluster installed in the data center of Cineca. PICO is intended to enable new "BigData" classes of applications, related to the management and processing of large quantities of data, coming both from simulations and experiments. The cluster is made of an Intel NeXtScale server, designed to optimize density and performance, driving a large data repository shared among all the HPC systems in Cineca.

== History ==
The development of PICO was sponsored by the Ministry of Education, Universities and Research (Italy) in 2015.

== Specifications ==
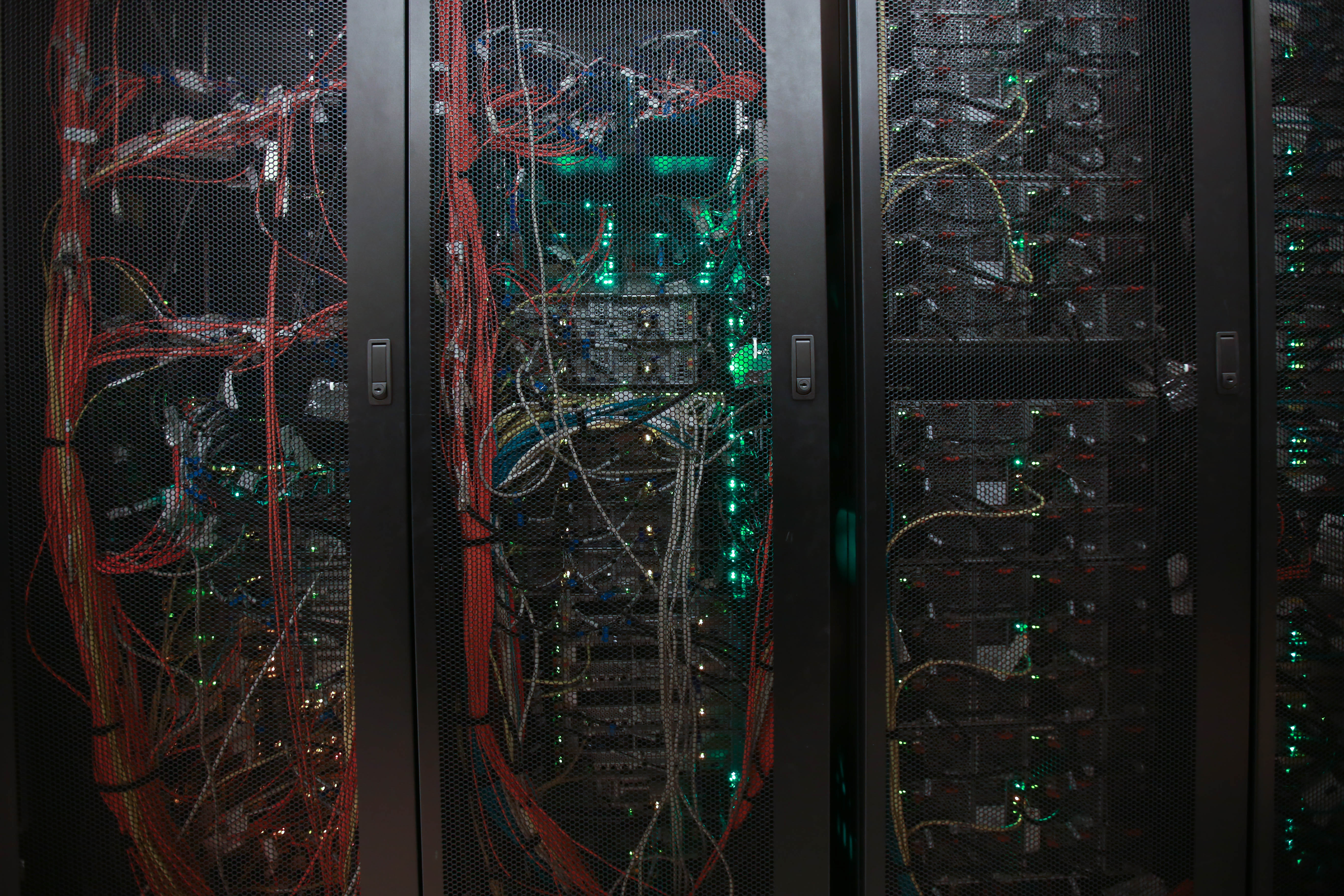
PICO's cables and LEDs at CINECA

PICO is an Intel Cluster made of 74 nodes of different types, devoted to different purposes, with the common task of data analytics and visualization on large amount of data.

- Login nodes: 2 × 20-core nodes, 128 GB-mem. Both of this two nodes are reachable with the IP: login.pico.cineca.it
- Compute Nodes: 51 × 20-core nodes, 128 GB-mem. A standard scientific computational environment is defined here. Pre-installed applications are in the visualization domain, as well as data analysis, post-processing and bioinformatics. It is possible to access this environment via ssh and submit large analysis in a PBS batch environment.
- Big memory Nodes: two nodes, big1 and big2, equipped respectively with 32 cores – 0.5 T and 40 cores – 1 T of RAM are available for specific activities, which require a remarkable quantity of memory. Both are HP DL980 servers.
- The big1 node is equipped with 8 Quad-Core Intel Xeon E7520 processors with a clock of 1.87 GHz and 512 GB of RAM, and a NVidia Quadro 6000 graphics card.
- The big2 node is equipped with 4 Ten-Core Intel Xeon E7-2860 with a clock of 2.26 GHz and 1024 GB of RAM.
- Viz nodes: 2 × (20-core, 128 GB-mem, 2 × GPU Nvidia K40) + 2 × (16-core, 512 GB-mem, 1 × GPU Nvidia K20). A remote visualization environment is defined on this partition, taking advantage from the large memory and the GPU acceleration.
- BigInsights nodes: 4 × 16-core nodes, 64 GB-mem/node, 32 TB local disks/node + 1 × 20-core nodes, 128 GB-mem.). On these nodes an IBM solution for Hadoop applications is available. InfoSphere BigInsights is available for special projects.
- Other nodes: 13 × 20-core nodes, 128 GB-mem. They are used for internal activities in the domain of Cloud computing, large Scientific Databases, hadoop for science.

== See also ==
- Supercomputing in Europe

== Articles about Pico and its network ==
- Cineca: dal supercomputing alla gestione dei big data (Luca De Biase)
- L’utilizzo dei Big Data in Istat: stato attuale e prospettive (presentation at ForumPA by Giulio Barcaroli - ISTAT)
- Centro internazionale di fisica teorica Abdus SalamSymposium on HPC & Data-Intensive Applications in Earth Science (presentation by Carlo Cavazzoni and Giuseppe Fiameni - Cineca)
