= Alessandro Cruto =

Italian inventor

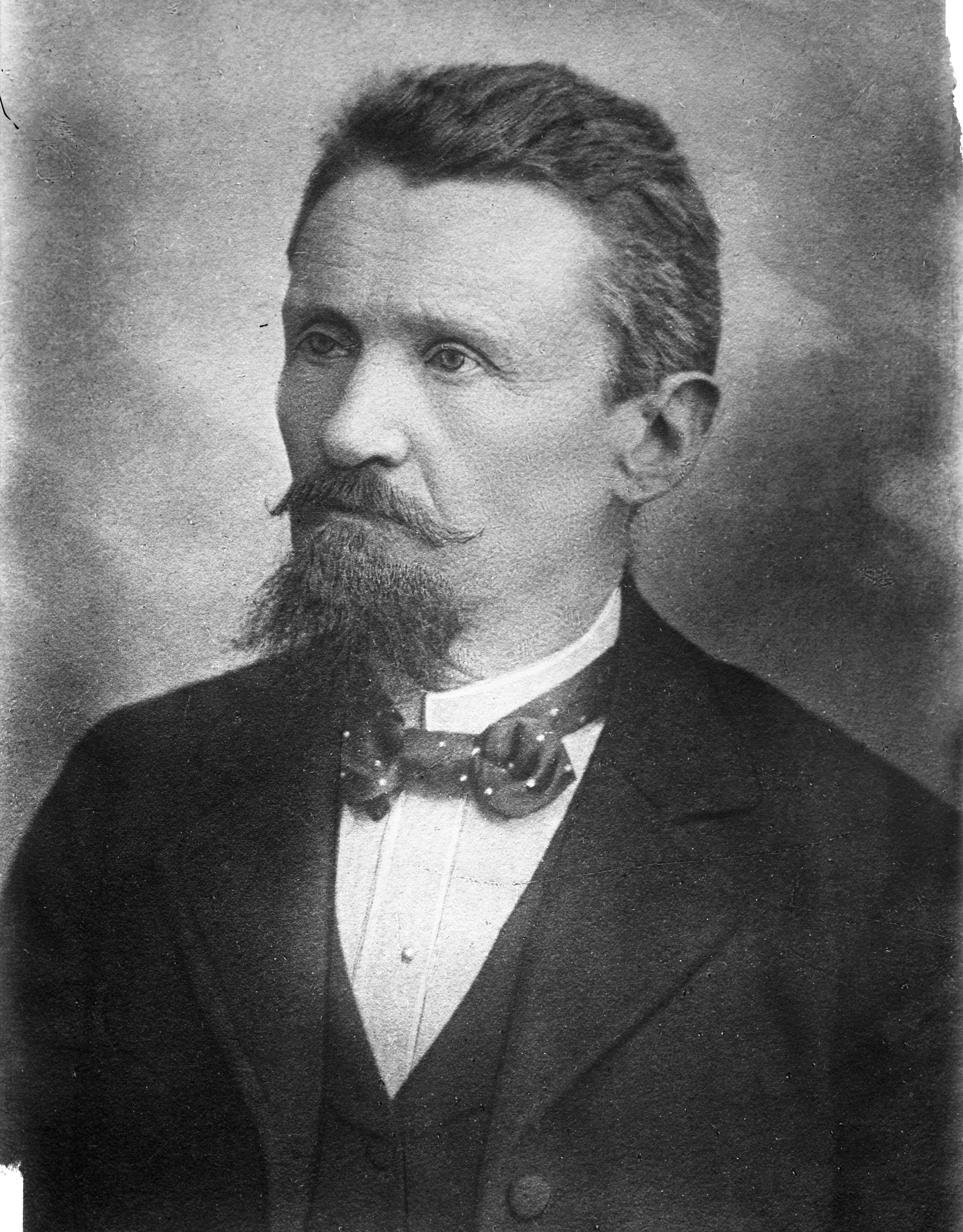
- Born: 24 May 1847; Piossasco, Italy
- Died: 15 December 1908 (aged 61); Turin, Italy
- Occupations: inventor, company founder

Alessandro Cruto was an Italian inventor, born in the town of Piossasco, near Turin, who created an early incandescent light bulb.

Son of a construction foreman, he attended the school of architecture at the University of Turin, while also attending Physics and Chemistry lectures with the dream of crystallizing carbon to obtain diamonds. In 1872 he opened a small workshop in his home village where he conducted tests on the production of pure carbon from ethylene. His efforts were rewarded in 1874 when his experiments succeeded in producing thin sheets of graphite, albeit his initial purpose was that of producing diamonds.

After attending some conferences held by Galileo Ferraris about the contemporary advances in electric technology – whose topics included Thomas Edison's experiments to find a suitable filament for incandescent lights – he discovered that a carbon filament treated with ethylene under high pressure and temperature acquired a positive resistance coefficient (its resistance depends on temperature; when temperature increases, it increases its resistance). Cruto's filament is produced by deposition of graphite on thin platinum filaments in the presence of gaseous hydrocarbons. Sublimating this platinum at high temperatures leaves behind thin filaments of super-pure graphite. He thought that his discovery could be used in incandescent lights instead of carbonized bamboo filament. Helped by Naccari, he experimented with his invention in 1880 in the physics laboratory of the University of Turin.

In 1882, he attended the Electricity Expo at Munich, where he gained fame with his technologically new light globe whose efficiency was better than that of Edison's light bulb, also because it produced a white light instead of the yellowish light of Edison's globe. His success was repeated at the International Turin Expo of 1884 to the extent that he sold his project in France, Switzerland, Cuba and United States.

After these successes and because his manufacturing facilities in Piossasco were inadequate, he decided to move his activities to a more suitable location. Such a location was identified in Alpignano where in 1885-1886 he founded a light globe factory that he managed until 1889 and that eventually grew to a productivity level of 1000 light bulbs a day. Eventually, due to strong disagreements with the factory new management, he resigned in order to pursue his favorite activity as an inventor. His old factory was sold a number of times, went bankrupt and was eventually acquired by Philips in 1927.

Cruto married late in life and spent the rest of his life between his family and his old laboratory. He continued his experiments on the accumulation of atmospheric energy and the invention of a toy called mosca elettrica ("electrical fly"). Cruto died, almost forgotten by all, in 1908.

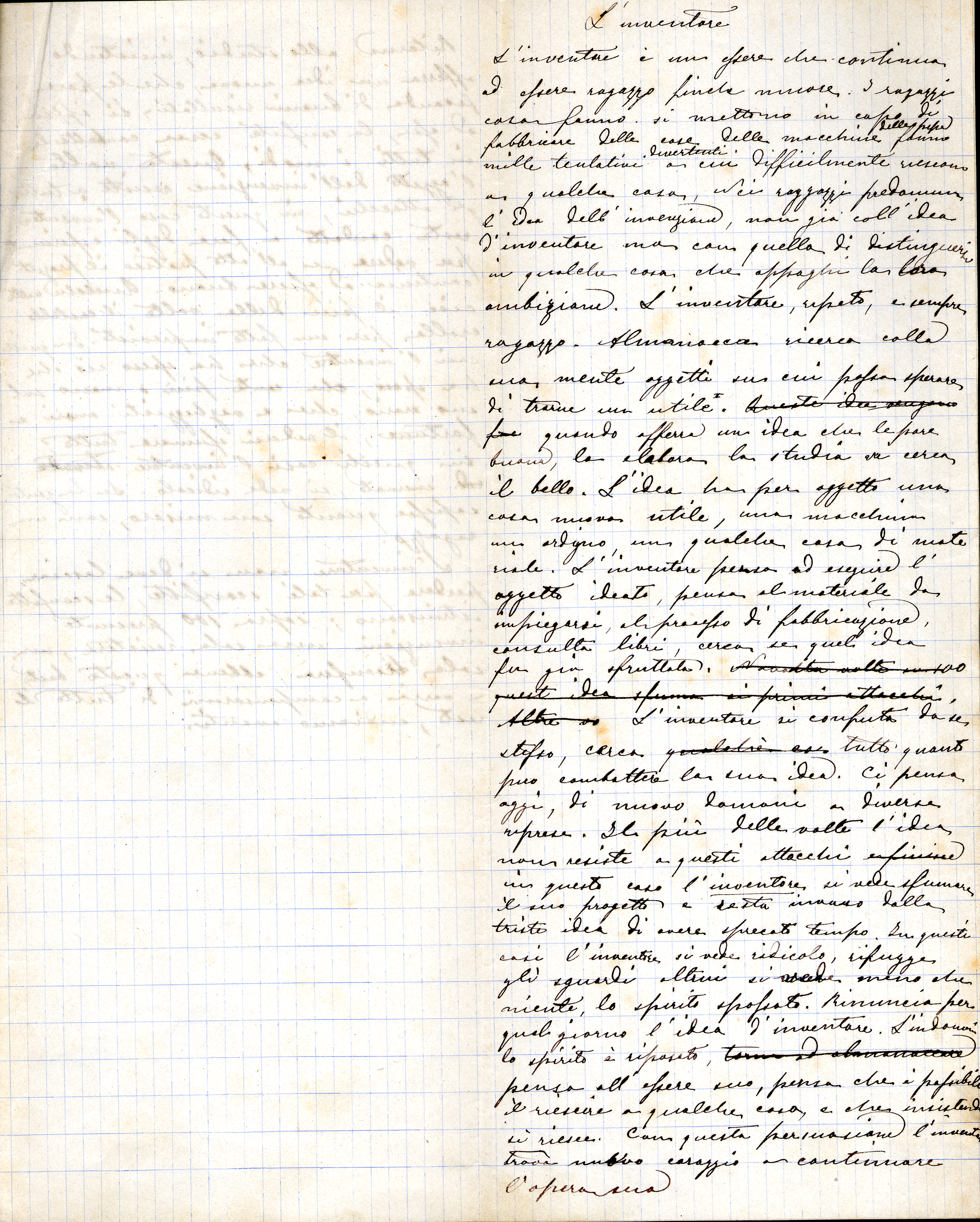
First page of the Alessandro Cruto's manuscript L'inventore ("The inventor")

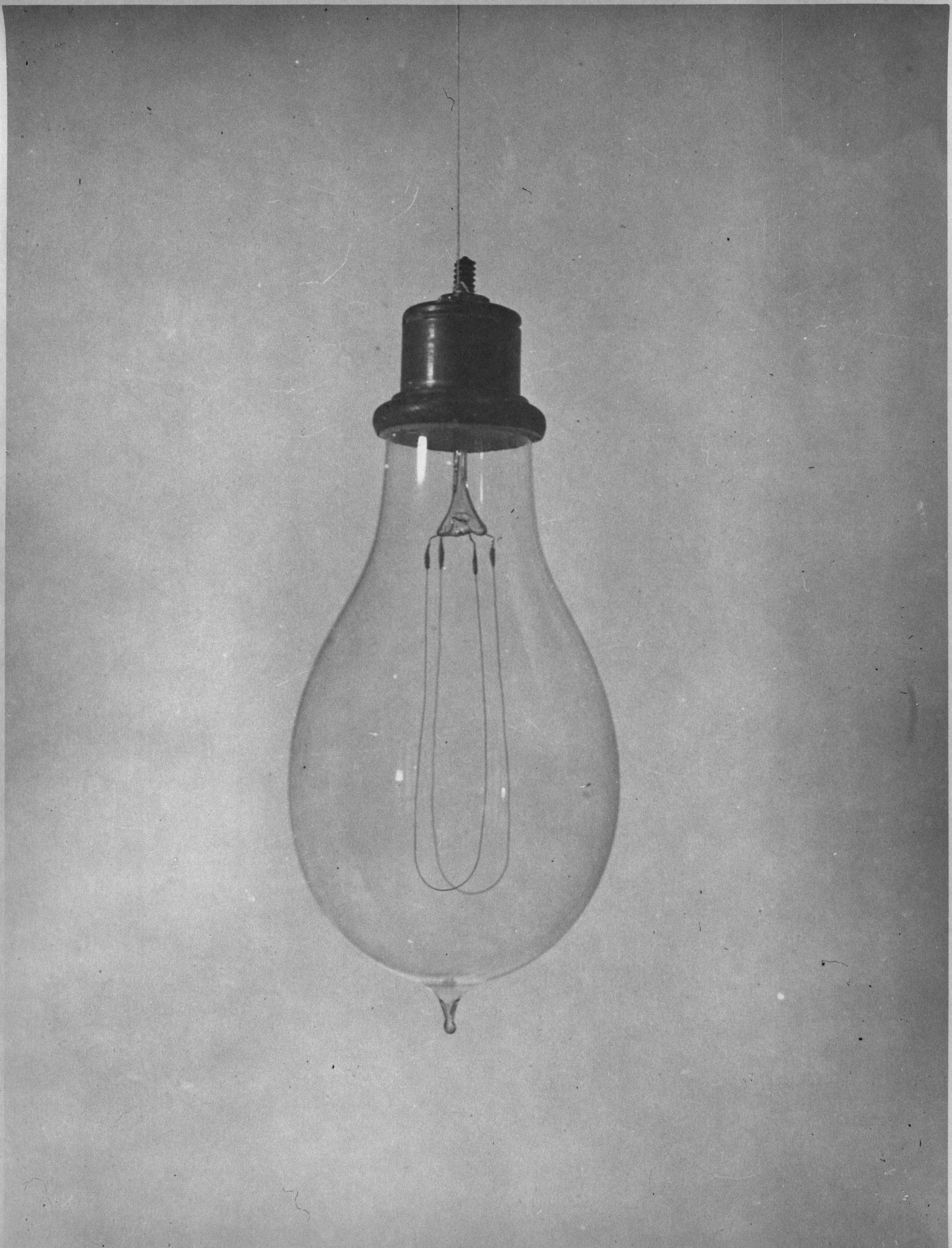
Cruto light bulb

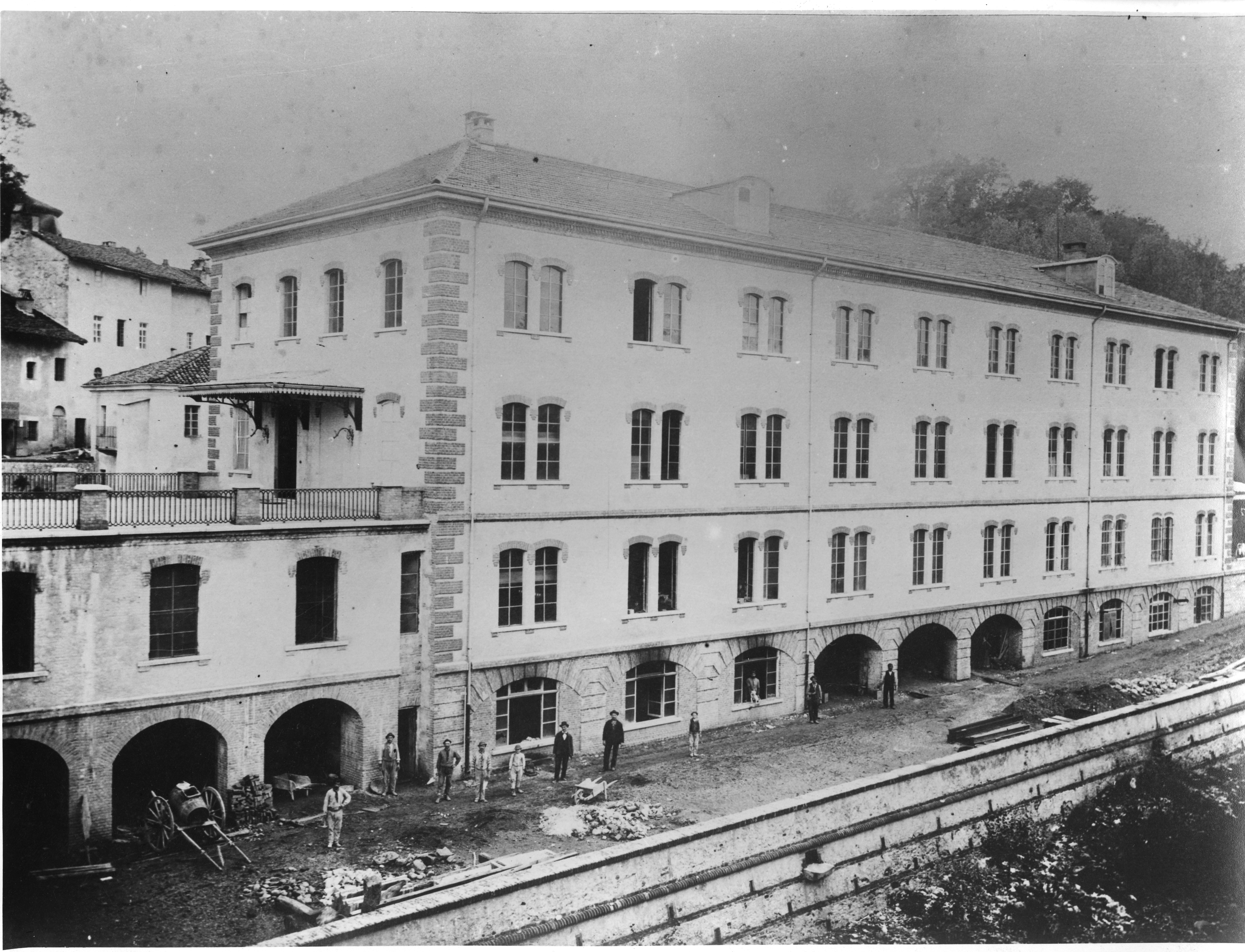
The Alpignano factory at the end of 19th century
