= Piko =

Piko may refer to:

- PIKO, a model train manufacturer
- Piko Interactive, an American game developer and publisher.
- Piko (singer) (b. 1988), a Japanese pop singer
- Piko (Filipino game), a Filipino children's game similar to hopscotch
- Piko, renamed Penny in English dubbing, a character from the anime Stitch!
- Piko (wrestler), a Japanese professional wrestler
- Utatane Piko, a vocaloid from Sony Entertainment

== See also ==
- Pico (disambiguation)
