= Pico Agudo =

Pico Agudo (Portuguese for "acute peak") may refer to:

== Azores ==
- Pico Agudo (Agualva), a peak near the village of Agualva on Terceira Island
- Pico Agudo (Santa Bárbara), a peak near the village of Santa Bárbara on Terceira Island

== Brazil ==
- Pico Agudo (Ibaiti), a peak in the municipality of Ibaiti, state of Paraná
- Pico Agudo (Santo Antônio do Pinhal), a peak in the municipality of Santo Antônio do Pinhal, state of São Paulo
- Pico Agudo (Sapopema), a peak in the municipality of Sapopema, state of Paraná

== Cape Verde ==
- Pico Agudo (São Nicolau), a village in the municipality of Ribeira Brava, São Nicolau
