= Fermi (supercomputer) =

Supercomputer located at CINECA

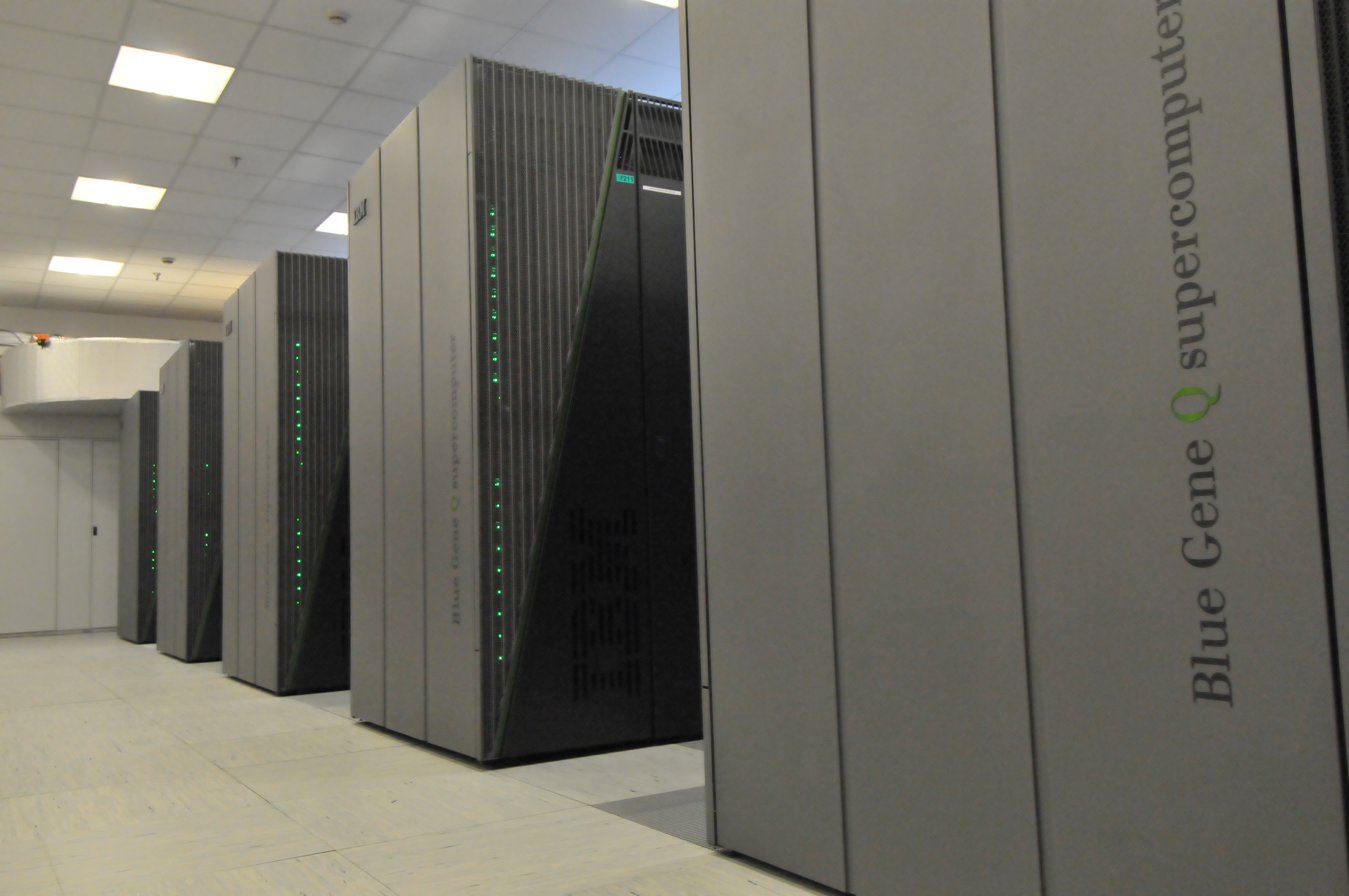
- Fermi BlueGene/Q
- Active: operational 2012
- Sponsors: Ministry of Education, Universities and Research (Italy)
- Operators: The members of the consortium
- Location: CINECA, Casalecchio di Reno, Italy
- Architecture: IBM BG/Q; 5D Torus Interconnect configuration 10,240 processors at 1.6 GHz with 16 IBM A2 cores each 163,840 cores
- Power: 822 KW
- Operating system: CNK
- Memory: 16 GB/node, 1 GB/core; 160 TiB
- Storage: 2 PByte of scratch space
- Speed: 2.097 PFLOPS
- Ranking: TOP500: 37, 2015-11
- Purpose: Material science, Weather, Climatology, Seismology, Biology, Computational chemistry, Computer science
- Legacy: Ranked 7th on TOP500 when built.
- Website: hpc.cineca.it/hardware/fermi

Fermi is a 2.097 petaFLOPS supercomputer located at CINECA.

== History ==
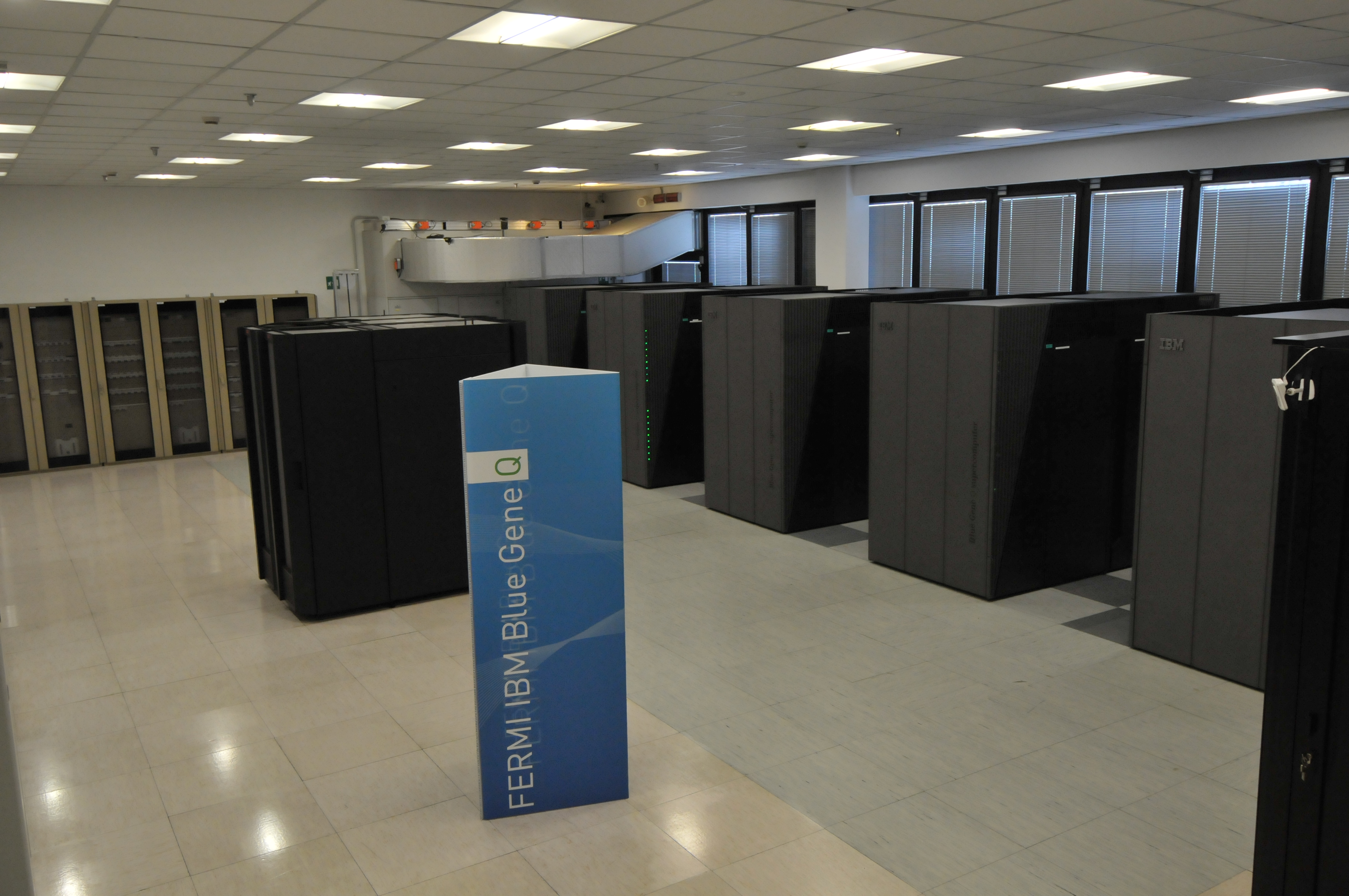
Supercomputer Fermi BlueGene/Q at CINECA

FERMI is the main HPC computer in CINECA. It was acquired in June 2012 and entered into full production on August 8 the same year. Fermi is the Italian national tier-0 system for scientific research and is also part of the European HPC infrastructure (PRACE). Its procurement was sponsored by the Italian Ministry of Education, Universities and Research.

In June 2012, Fermi reached the seventh position on the TOP500 list of fastest supercomputers in the world.

In the Graph500 list of top supercomputers, Fermi reached the fifth position, testing at 2,567 gigaTEPS (traversed edges per second).

== Specifications ==
FERMI is a Blue Gene/Q system, the last generation of the IBM project for designing petascale supercomputers. It consists of 10 racks, two midplanes each, for a total of 10.240 compute nodes and 163.840 cores.

- Each compute card (compute node) features a 1.6 GHz IBM processor chip with 16 A2 cores, 16 GB of RAM and the network connections. A total of 32 compute nodes are plugged into a node card. Then 16 node cards are deployed on one midplane which is combined with another midplane and two I/O drawers to fill a rack with a total of 32·32·16 = 16K cores for each rack. On the compute nodes runs a light Linux-like kernel (CNK − compute-node kernel).
- Compute nodes are disk-less. I/O functionalities are provided by I/O nodes.
- The nodes are accessed by ssh via the front-end nodes (or login nodes) at login.fermi.cineca.it. The login nodes run a complete RedHat Linux distribution (6.2). Parallel applications have to be cross-compiled on the front-end nodes and can only be executed on the partition defined on the compute nodes.

The CINECA system consists of 10 racks configured as follows:

- 2 racks: 16 I/O nodes per rack (minimum job allocation of 64 nodes - 1024 cores).
- 8 racks: 8 I/O nodes per rack (minimum job allocation of 128 nodes - 2048 cores).

== See also ==
- Supercomputing in Europe

== Articles about Fermi and its network ==
- Il Sole 24 ore - in Italian
- Datacenter Knowledge
