= Picon =

Picon may refer to:

- Avatar (computing), used in the Apple Computer instant messaging program iChat
- Picón, Spain
- Picon (apéritif), an apéritif
- Picon Punch, a drink popularized by Basque-Americans
- Picon (Battlestar Galactica), one of the Twelve Colonies of humans in the television series Battlestar Galactica
- Personal icon, referenced in Vismon

== People ==
- Gaëtan Picon (1915-1976), French essayist and art critic
- José Antonio Picón Sedano (born 1988), Spanish footballer known as Picón
- Mariano Picón Salas (1901–1965), Venezuelan diplomat
- Molly Picon (1898–1992), American actress
