= Consorzio Interuniversitario Lombardo per l'Elaborazione Automatica =

The Consorzio Interuniversitario Lombardo per l'Elaborazione Automatica (CILEA) was a consortium of universities in Italy. Founded in 1974, it operated from headquarters in Milan. In July 2013 CILEA merged into the CINECA academic consortium.

== History ==
The consortium aimed to promote the applications of computer science to meet the needs of research and, secondly, university teaching. Over time the consortium diversified its activities and developed services related to electronic publishing, digital libraries, high-performance computing, software development, and technical support. It also increased its staff, and expanded its target audience to include both Lombardy and the rest of Italy.

In 1998 the consortium launched the CILEA Digital Library (CDL), which participated in several related groups: Osservatorio italiano sulla cooperazione per le risorse informative elettroniche (INFER), International Coalition of Library Consortia (ICOLC), and Southern European Libraries Link (SELL). The library also collaborated with Italian consortia Coordinamento Interuniversitario Basi dati & Editoria in Rete (CIBER) and Cooperazione Interuniversitaria Periodici Elettronici (CIPE).

With the Associazione Italiana Biblioteche, the consortium developed the online MAI-MetaOPAC Azalai in 1999.

== See also ==
- List of universities in Italy
