= Cray CX1 =

2008 supercomputer

The Cray CX1 is a deskside workstation designed by Cray Inc., based on the x86-64 processor architecture. It was launched on September 16, 2008, and was discontinued in early 2012. It comprises a single chassis blade server design that supports a maximum of eight modular single-width blades, giving up to 96 processor cores. Computational load can be run independently on each blade and/or combined using clustering techniques.

== Blade configurations ==
=== Compute blade ===
The most basic of the modular blade configurations, the single-width compute blade supports dual-socket Intel Xeon 5400, 5500, and 5600 series processors, up to eight DIMMs of DDR3 SDRAM (PC3-8500), and two 2.5" SATA HDDs. Furthermore, each compute blade supports the addition of a PCIe x16 card for graphics or further expansion. Originally offered with the Intel E5400 series processor, later CX1 configurations made either the low-power "L5xxx" series or the high-performance "X5xxx" series Intel processors available to customers. Depending on the blade model, both Gigabit Ethernet and DDR Infiniband interconnects were available – those blades not factory-equipped with Infiniband supported third-party additions through the PCIe expansion port.

=== Storage blade ===
Building on the modular expansion capabilities of the compute blade, the storage blade enabled customers to add up to eight 2.5" SATA HDDs or four 3.5" SATA HDDs to a separate, but physically connected, single-width blade add-on. This bolted-on expansion took the place of the default blade cover and extended the blade unit to a two-width module. From a computational standpoint, the storage blade was no different from the compute blade, offering the same Intel processor options. Unlike the compute blade, PCIe expansion was not available in the storage blade, as the RAID card supporting the additional hard drives occupied this port.

=== Visualization and GPU blades ===
Similar to the storage blade expansion, both workstation visualization and GPGPU blades were offered, taking advantage of the PCIe expansion port to extend the capabilities of the base compute blade. Equipped with either workstation Nvidia Quadro graphics cards or Nvidia Tesla scientific cards, the visualization configurations extended the integrated graphics capabilities of the compute blade and offered customers access to Nvidia's CUDA programming architecture to drastically speed up critical scientific and engineering applications.

== Unique features ==
In addition to offering unparalleled deskside performance for its day, the Cray CX1 also pioneered several unique technologies to make possible the integration of supercomputing into the traditional office space. The CX1 utilized an active noise cancellation system built into its cooling apparatus to quiet the sounds generated by the chassis's two large fans. Rather than requiring the deployment of separate Ethernet and/or Infiniband networks, the CX1 integrated network switches for both into the chassis to facilitate these high-speed interconnect protocols required by clustered simulations and applications. Additionally, unlike traditional servers and supercomputers that make use of higher 220 V power, the CX1's redundant power supplies were designed to support traditional office power (120 V AC, 20 A). Finally, the CX1 has a integrated touchscreen control panel on the front face of the machine from which users can not only control each of the blades, but control gauge power consumption, core temperature, and fan speeds for the entire chassis.

== Comparison with other Cray systems ==
The CX1 and XT5h are fundamentally different architectures, and due to their differences, XT5 blades may not be used in place of CX1 blades, and vice versa. To compare the two:

- An XT5h supercomputer supports vector, FPGA, and scalar compute blades (X2, XR1, and XT4/XT5 blades, respectively), typically supported by service blades for network access and hosting a Lustre filesystem layered over several RAID modules.
  - The XT5h's operating system is UNICOS/lc, a combination of SUSE Linux Enterprise Server and Sandia's Catamount or Cray's Compute Node Linux.
- A CX1 supercomputer supports GPU and scalar compute blades (Nvidia Quadro and Intel Xeon, respectively), typically supported by enclosed network switches (Gigabit Ethernet, Infiniband) and service blades hosting RAID modules.
  - CX1-supported operating systems include Red Hat Enterprise Linux and Windows HPC Server 2008.
