= The Portland Group =

American technology company

PGI
- Type: Subsidiary
- Industry: Software, programming tools
- Founded: 1989; 37 years ago in Wilsonville, Oregon, United States
- Founders: Vince Schuster; Larry Meadows; Bob Toelle; Glenn Denison
- Fate: Acquired by Nvidia
- Headquarters: Beaverton, Oregon, United States
- Area served: Worldwide
- Products: Compilers; Debuggers; Profilers; IDEs
- Parent: STMicroelectronics (2000–2013)
- Website: pgroup.com

PGI (formerly The Portland Group, Inc.) was a company that produced a set of commercially available Fortran, C and C++ compilers for high-performance computing systems. On July 29, 2013, Nvidia acquired The Portland Group, Inc. As of August 5, 2020, the "PGI Compilers and Tools" technology is a part of the Nvidia HPC SDK product available as a free download from Nvidia.

== Company history ==
The Portland Group was founded as a privately held company in 1989, using compiler technology developed at and acquired from Floating Point Systems Inc. The first products, pipelining Fortran and C compilers, were released in 1991, targeting the Intel i860 processor. These compilers were used on Intel supercomputers like the iPSC/860, the Touchstone Delta, and the Paragon, and were the compilers of choice for the majority of i860-based platforms.

In the early 1990s, PGI was deeply involved in the development of High Performance Fortran, or HPF, a data parallel language extension to Fortran 90 which provides a portable programming interface for a wide variety of architectures. PGI produced an HPF compiler, called PGHPF, until its last release, version 15.10, on October 28, 2015.

In 1996, PGI developed x86 compilers for the ASCI Red Supercomputer at Sandia National Laboratories, the first computer system to sustain teraflop performance. In 1997, PGI released x86 compilers for general use on Linux workstations.

The Portland Group was acquired by STMicroelectronics on December 19, 2000. During STMicroelectronics ownership, PGI operated as a wholly owned subsidiary producing high-performance computing (HPC) compilers and tools for Linux, Windows, Mac OS, and STMicroelectronics ST100 series of embedded DSP cores.

PGI has been deeply involved in the expansion of the use of GPGPUs for high-performance computing, developing CUDA Fortran with Nvidia and PGI Accelerator Fortran and C compilers which use programming directives. PGI and NVIDIA have both participated in the specification of the new standard OpenACC directives for GPU computing since it was first announced on November 3, 2011. On May 21, 2013, PGI released a compiler for the OpenCL language on multi-core ARM processors.

Nvidia acquired PGI from STMicroelectronics on July 29, 2013 and offered the PGI technology under the "PGI Compilers and Tools" product line. On August 5, 2020, Nvidia announced that the "PGI Compilers and Tools" product line has evolved into a new NVIDIA HPC SDK product available as a free download from Nvidia. The Nvidia HPC SDK includes rebranded PGI compilers and added features for developing HPC applications.

== Product and market history ==
=== Compilers ===
PGI compilers incorporate global optimization, vectorization, software pipelining, and shared-memory parallelization capabilities targeting both Intel and AMD processors. PGI supports the following high-level languages:

- Fortran 77
- Fortran 90/95/2003
- Fortran 2008 (partial)
- High Performance Fortran (HPF)
- ANSI C99 with K&R extensions
- ANSI/ISO C++
- CUDA Fortran
- OpenCL
- OpenACC
- OpenMP

Below is a list of the PGI compilers that have been rebranded and integrated into the Nvidia HPC SDK:

- Fortran: nvfortran (formerly pgfortran)
- C: nvc (formerly pgcc)
- C++: nvc++ (formerly pgc++)

=== Programming tools ===
PGI also provided a parallel debugger, PGDBG, and a performance profiler, PGPROF, both of which supported OpenMP and MPI parallelism on Linux, Windows, and Mac OS. On Windows, the PGI Fortran compiler and debugger was fully integrated into Microsoft Visual Studio as a product called PGI Visual Fortran (PVF). Mac OS support and the PVF product were discontinued after the release of PGI version 19.10 on November 6, 2019.

Below is a list of PGI programming tools that have been retired and replaced by other Nvidia programming tools in the Nvidia HPC SDK:

- Debugger: PGDBG (replaced with cuda-gdb)
- Profiler: PGPROF (replaced with Nsight)

=== PGI milestones ===
- 1989 – PGI founded
- 1991 – Pipelining i860 Compilers
- 1994 – Parallel i860 Compilers
- 1996 – ASCI Red TFLOPS Compilers
- 1997 – Linux/x86 Compilers
- 1998 – OpenMP for Linux/x86
- 1999 – SSE/SIMD Vectorization
- 1999 - PGI CDK Cluster Development Kit
- 2000 - STMicroelectronics acquires PGI
- 2001 – VLIW ST100 Compilers
- 2003 – 64-bit Linux/x86 Compilers
- 2004 – ASCI Red Storm Compilers
- 2005 – PGI Unified Binary Technology
- 2006 – PGI Visual Fortran
- 2007 – 64-bit Mac OS Compilers
- 2008 – PGI Accelerator Compilers
- 2009 – CUDA Fortran Compiler
- 2010 – CUDA X86 Compiler
- 2011 – AVX/FMA Vectorization
- 2012 – OpenACC standard directives for GPU computing
- 2013 – PGI OpenCL compiler for Multi-core ARM CPUs. Removed after Nvidia bought PGI.
- 2013 - Nvidia acquires PGI from STMicroelectronics. Nvidia offers the PGI technology under a "PGI Compilers and Tools" product line.
- 2015 - Flang (now known as "Classic Flang"), an open source Fortran Front-End for LLVM, is released.
- 2018 - Development of a new Flang Fortran Front-End, based on the Fortran 2018 standard, begins.
- 2020 - Nvidia integrates the PGI technology into a new NVIDIA HPC SDK product. Nvidia retires the "PGI Compilers and Tools" brand name.

== See also ==
- Fortran
- C
- C++
- Debugger
- Profiler
- IDE
