= Portland Group =

Portland Group may refer to:

- The Portland Group, a computer company
- Portland Group (geology) or Portlandian, a series of rock strata from the Late Jurassic of southern England
