= SUNMOS =

Computer operating system

SUNMOS (Sandia/UNM Operating System) is an operating system jointly developed by Sandia National Laboratories and the Computer Science Department at the University of New Mexico. The goal of the project, started in 1991, is to develop a highly portable, yet efficient, operating system for massively parallel-distributed memory systems.

SUNMOS uses a single-tasking kernel and does not provide demand paging. It takes control of all nodes in the distributed system. Once an application is loaded and running, it can manage all the available memory on a node and use the full resources provided by the hardware. Applications are started and controlled from a process called yod that runs on the host node. Yod runs on a Sun frontend for the nCUBE 2, and on a service node on the Intel Paragon.

SUNMOS was developed as a reaction to the heavy weight version of OSF/1 that ran as a single-system image on the Paragon and consumed 8-12 MB of the 16 MB available on each node, leaving little memory available for the compute applications. In comparison, SUNMOS used 250 KB of memory per node. Additionally, the overhead of OSF/1 limited the network bandwidth to 35 MB/s, while SUNMOS was able to use 170 MB/s of the peak 200 MB/s available.

The ideas in SUNMOS inspired PUMA, a multitasking variant that only ran on the i860 Paragon. Among the extensions in PUMA was the Portals API, a scalable, high performance message passing API. Intel ported PUMA and Portals to the Pentium Pro based ASCI Red system and named it Cougar. Cray ported Cougar to the Opteron based Cray XT3 and renamed it Catamount. A version of Catamount was released to the public named OpenCatamount.

In 2009, the Catamount lightweight kernel was selected for an R&D 100 Award.

== See also ==
- Compute Node Linux
- CNK operating system
