= Barbara Chapman =

Computer scientist

Barbara Mary Chapman (born 1954) is a computer scientist specializing in parallel programming, and parallel programming languages and compilers, including the development of OpenMP and OpenACC. Originally from New Zealand, she was educated in New Zealand, Germany, and Ireland. She works in the US as a professor of computer science at Stony Brook University, affiliated with its Institute for Advanced Computational Science, and as a distinguished technologist for the Cray Programming Environment of Hewlett Packard Enterprise.

== Education and career ==
Chapman was born in 1954 in New Zealand. After receiving a bachelor's degree in mathematics with first class honours from the University of Canterbury, she completed a Ph.D. in 1998 at Queen's University Belfast with a dissertation involving middleware for distributed memory. Her dissertation, Software Support for Advanced Applications on Distributed Memory Multiprocessor Systems, was supervised by Ronald Perrott.

She directed the Center for Advanced Computing and Data Systems at the University of Houston before moving to a joint position at Stony Brook and the Brookhaven National Laboratory in 2015. She was named head of Brookhaven's Computer Science and Mathematics Group in 2016. In 2022 she stepped down from her position at Brookhaven, while keeping her affiliation with Stony Brook, to become a distinguished technologist for the Cray Programming Environment of Hewlett Packard Enterprise.

== Recognition ==
Chapman was named as a Fellow of the American Association for the Advancement of Science in its 2024 class of fellows.
