= Personal supercomputer =

A personal supercomputer (PSC) is a marketing ploy used by computer manufacturers for high-performance computer systems and was a popular term in the mid-2000s to early 2010s. There is no exact definition for what a personal supercomputer is. Many systems have had that label put on them like the Cray CX1 and the Apple Power Mac G4. Generally, though the label is used on computers that are high end workstations and servers and have multiple processors and is small enough to fit on a desk or to the side. Other terms like PSC are Desktop/deskside supercomputers and supercomputers in a box.

== Deskside clusters ==
This is the closest thing to a formal definition of a personal supercomputer as most Computers marketed as personal supercomputers are Deskside clusters like the Cray CX1. A Deskside cluster is as defined by insideHPC.com “Deskside clusters come in a chassis that you can plug into the wall of your office, and they are designed to sit on the floor next to your desk. The chassis can hold a relatively small number of computers that are on blades, trays, or in enclosures that slide into the chassis and bundle everything together.” The Blade or node are equipped with CPU/s and RAM also it may be equipped with GPU/s so that it may be used for CAD or for computation and the blade may have bays for hard drives built in.

== Applications ==
They can be used in medical applications for processing brain and body scans, resulting in faster diagnosis. Another application is persistent aerial surveillance where large amounts of video data need to be processed and stored. Also they are used in AI for deep learning and machine learning. One more use is in the field of data analysis which requires large amounts of computational power.

== Computers marketed as personal supercomputers ==
=== Deskside clusters ===
- TyanPSC
- Cray CX1
- SGI Octane III

=== High End Workstations ===
- Nvidia Tesla Personal Supercomputer
- Nvidia DGX Station

=== Other computers ===
- Intel iPSC
