= Cray XK6 =

The Cray XK6 made by Cray is an enhanced version of the Cray XE6 supercomputer, announced in May 2011. The XK6 uses the same "blade" architecture of the XE6, with each XK6 blade comprising four compute "nodes". Each node consists of a 16-core AMD Opteron 6200 processor with 16 or 32 GB of DDR3 RAM and an Nvidia Tesla X2090 GPGPU with 6 GB of GDDR5 RAM, the two connected via PCI Express 2.0. Two Gemini router ASICs are shared between the nodes on a blade, providing a 3-dimensional torus network topology between nodes. This means that it has 576 GB of Graphics memory and over 1500 CPU cores, several orders of magnitude more powerful than the best publicly available computer on the market.

An XK6 cabinet accommodates 24 blades (96 nodes). Each of the Tesla processors is rated at 665 double-precision gigaflops giving 63.8 teraflops per cabinet. The XK6 is capable of scaling to 500,000 Opteron cores, giving up to 50 petaflops total hybrid peak performance.

The XK6 runs the Cray Linux Environment. This incorporates SUSE Linux Enterprise Server and Cray's Compute Node Linux.

The first order for an XK6 system was an upgrade of an existing XE6m at the Swiss National Supercomputing Centre (CSCS).
