= Oak Ridge Leadership Computing Facility =

Computing facility

The Oak Ridge Leadership Computing Facility (OLCF), formerly the National Leadership Computing Facility, is a designated user facility operated by Oak Ridge National Laboratory and the Department of Energy. It contains several supercomputers, the largest of which is an HPE OLCF-5 named Frontier, which was ranked 1st on the TOP500 list of world's fastest supercomputers as of June 2023. It is located in Oak Ridge, Tennessee.

== History ==
Under its former name of the National Leadership Computing Facility, the OLCF was founded in 1992 at Oak Ridge National Laboratory to advance the state of the art in high-performance computing (HPC) by bringing a new generation of parallel computers out of the laboratory and into the hands of the scientists who could most use them. It was called the Center for Computational Sciences, or CCS, and had an Intel Paragon computer. Over time, it expanded to contain many supercomputers including the Intel Paragon, an IBM system based on the POWER3, an IBM system based on the POWER4, SGI Altix, and more recently, the Cray X1E, Cray XD1, Cray XT3, Cray XT4, Cray XT5, and Titan.

The OLCF is a collaboration of the DOE-SC and a world-class team from national laboratories, research institutions, computing centers, universities, and vendors. It evaluates and deploys technology designed to maximize the performance of scientific applications and engages the scientific and engineering communities for the purpose of advancing science and technology research in the United States. To accomplish this, the OLCF has developed and implemented a three-pronged strategy for building and engaging the research communities to define critical computational needs, work with the manufacturers of HPC resources to express and meet those needs, and develop the tools and algorithms to best take advantage of the HPC resources.

== Computers and projects ==
OLCF's fastest computer, Frontier, is a 1.102 ExaFLOPs HPE OLCF-5 supercomputer with a CPU/GPU hybrid architecture. The combination of CPUs and GPUs will allow Titan and future systems to overcome power and space limitations inherent in previous generations of high-performance computers.

The facility also contains a petabyte High Performance Storage System (HPSS) that currently stores upwards of 29 petabytes of data.

OLCF facilities are accessible through the Energy Sciences Network or ESnet.

Resources of the Oak Ridge Leadership Computing Facility are dedicated to a limited number of high-impact, grand challenge scale projects. Calls for proposals are initiated throughout the year and large, multi-institution proposals are considered. 95% of the OLCF resources are dedicated to these projects. Participants may inquire about joining an existing project by contacting the project's Principal Investigator.
