= INK (operating system) =

Operating system that runs on the input output nodes of the IBM Blue Gene supercomputer

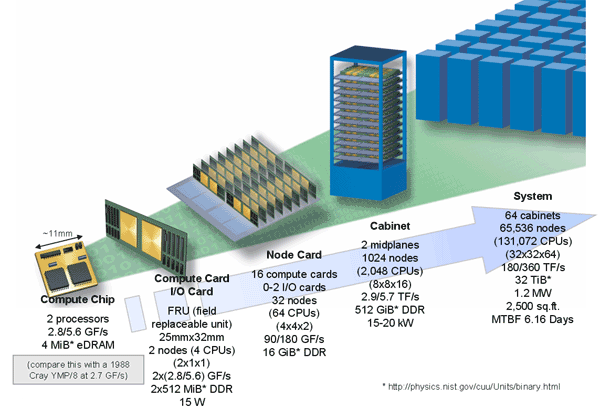
The Blue Gene compute hierarchy. A CNK instance runs on each of the compute nodes.

INK (for I/O Node Kernel) is the operating system that runs on the input output nodes of the IBM Blue Gene supercomputer. INK is a Linux derivative.

== See also ==
- Compute Node Linux
- Timeline of operating systems
- Rocks Cluster Distribution
- Cray Linux Environment
