= Automate Schedule =

Job scheduler and workload automation solution for Windows, UNIX, and Linux servers

Automate Schedule (ex Skybot Scheduler)
- Developer: HelpSystems
- Stable release: 4.2 / October 2017
- Operating system: Unix, Linux, Windows, macOS
- Type: job scheduler
- License: Proprietary
- Website: Official webpage

Automate Schedule (ex Skybot Scheduler) is an enterprise job scheduler and workload automation solution for Windows, UNIX, and Linux servers. Automate Schedule is sold by HelpSystems. HelpSystems is headquartered in Eden Prairie, MN and is backed by TA Associates, Charlesbank Capital Partners, and HGGC.

Automate Schedule consists of a PostgreSQL database, an apache tomcat web server, java-based agents on Windows, macOS, Linux and Unix (including Solaris, AIX and HP-UX). The job scheduler's user interface can be any modern web browser.

== Applications ==
Automate Schedule builds complex job schedules across multiple systems and applications including:

- Oracle E-Business Suite
- SAP NetWeaver
- Informatica PowerCenter
- Informatica Cloud
- MS SQL Server
- Windows Task Scheduler
- Web Services
- Windows Desktop applications
- Cron
- Robot Schedule
- Other command-based batch jobs or background processes.

== Features ==
Automate Schedule exposes a RESTful web services API to enable manipulation of functions in Automate Schedule programmatically. Automate Schedule’s web services use HTTP basic authentication, and returns XML responses. Batch job schedules can be manipulated with the web services feature using a command line interface available on any Automate Schedule agent. The 3.8 release includes job suite enhancements] and expanded SAP support.

Its parent company, HelpSystems, was named one of Star Tribune's Top Workplaces in 2012, 2013, and 2014

== See also ==
- Hilbert curve scheduling
