= Cray C90 =

Supercomputer by Cray Research

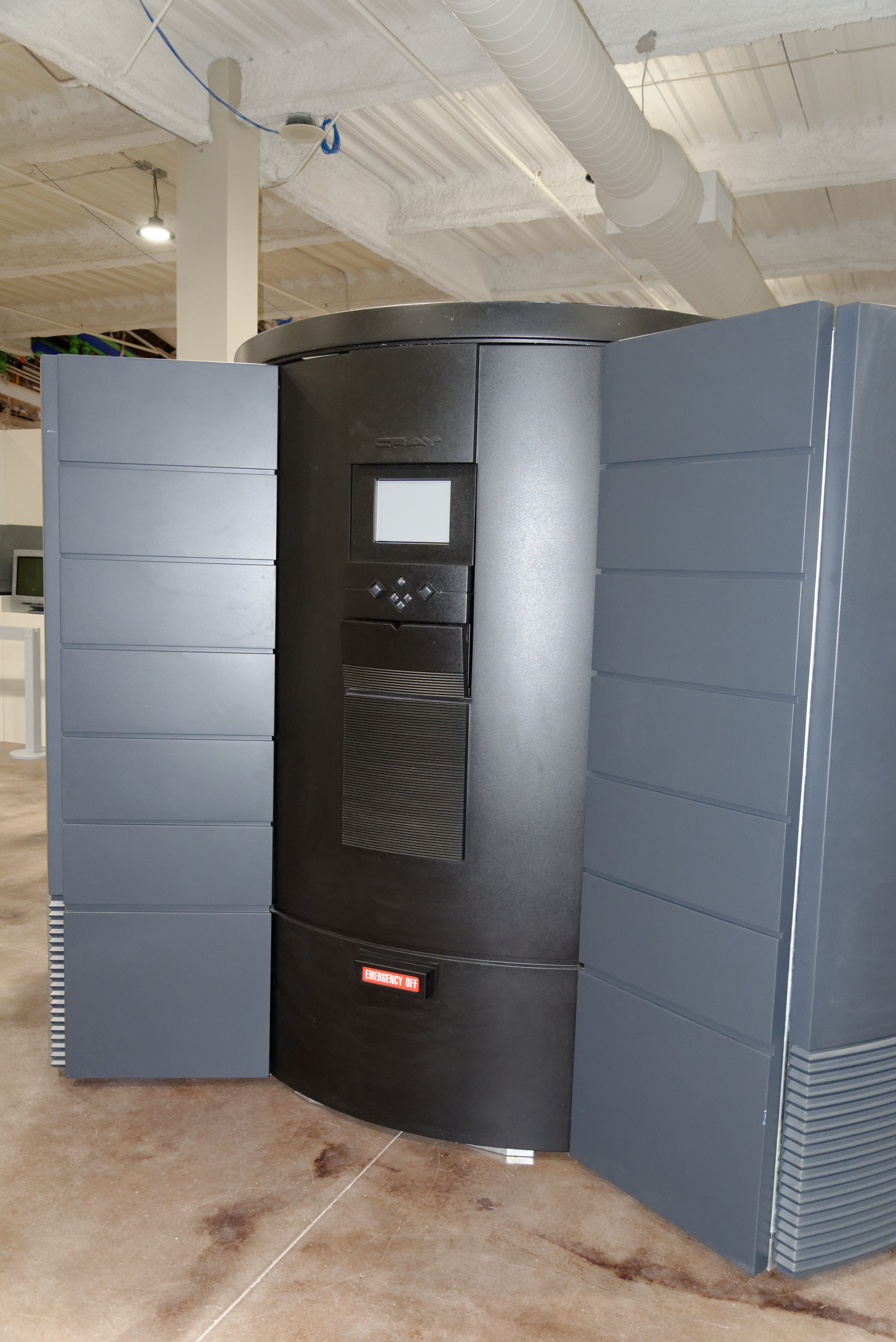
Cray C90 C916 at the Mimms Museum of Technology and Art

The Cray C90 series (initially named the Y-MP C90) was a vector processor supercomputer launched by Cray Research in 1991. The C90 was a development of the Cray Y-MP architecture. Compared to the Y-MP, the C90 processor had a dual vector pipeline and a faster 4.1 ns clock cycle (244 MHz), which together gave three times the performance of the Y-MP processor. The maximum number of processors in a system was also doubled from eight to 16. The C90 series used the same Model E IOS (Input/Output Subsystem) and UNICOS operating system as the earlier Y-MP Model E.

The C90 series included the C94, C98 and C916 models (configurations with a maximum of four, eight, and 16 processor respectively) and the C92A and C94A (air-cooled models). Maximum SRAM memory was between 1 and 8 GB, depending on model.

The D92, D92A, D94 and D98 (also known as the C92D, C92AD, C94D and C98D respectively) variants were equipped with slower, but higher-density DRAM memory, allowing increased maximum memory sizes of up to 16 GB, depending on the model.

The successor system was the Cray T90.

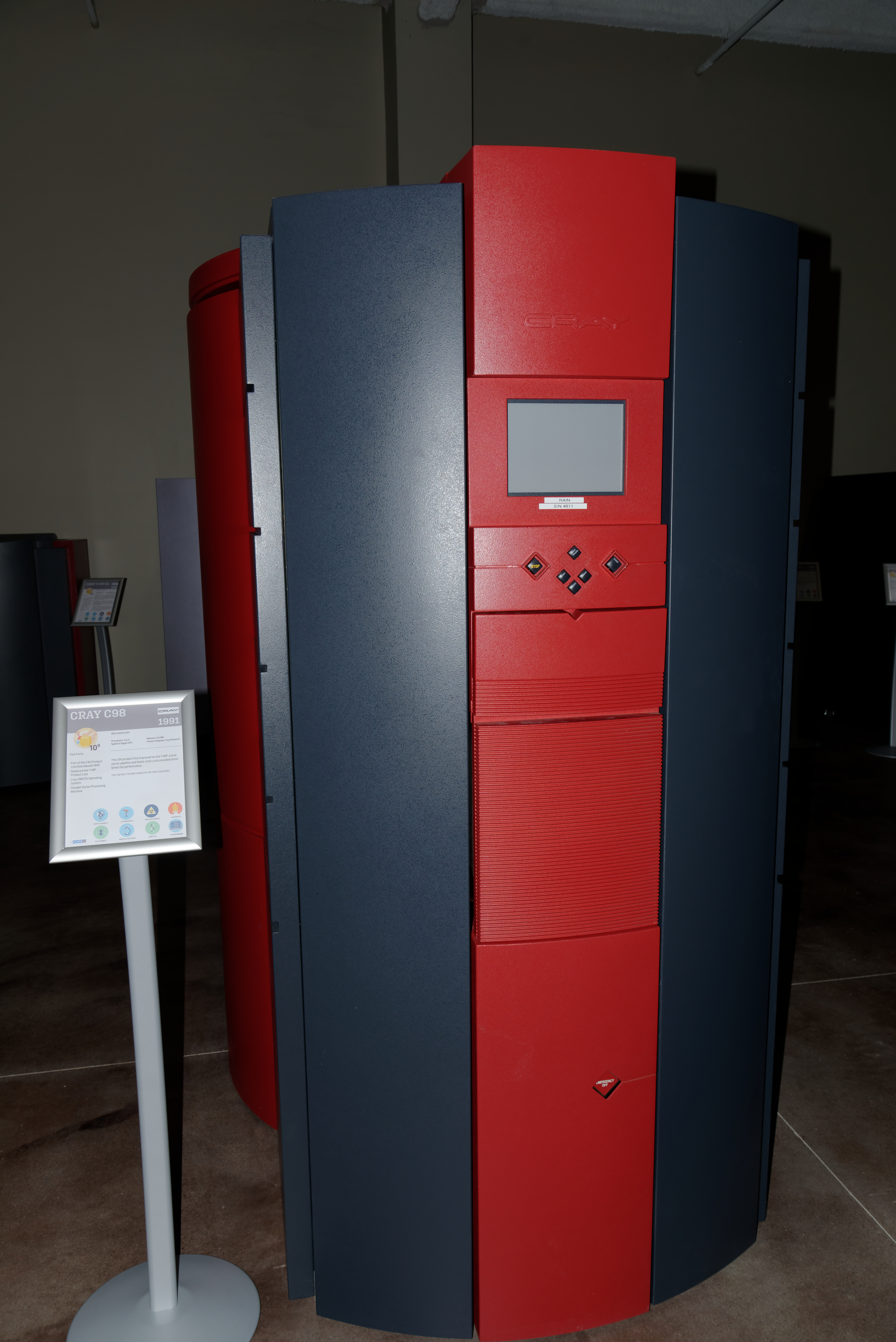
Cray C98 from 1991
