= Nvidia Tesla Personal Supercomputer =

Desktop computer

The Tesla Personal Supercomputer is a desktop computer (personal supercomputer) that is backed by Nvidia and built by various hardware vendors. It is meant to be a demonstration of the capabilities of Nvidia's Tesla GPGPU brand; it utilizes Nvidia's CUDA parallel computing architecture and is powered by up to 2688 parallel processing cores per GPGPU, which allow it to achieve speeds up to 250 times faster than standard PCs, according to Nvidia.

== See also ==
- Fastra II
- Nvidia Tesla
