= Hilbert curve scheduling =

Job scheduling method in computing

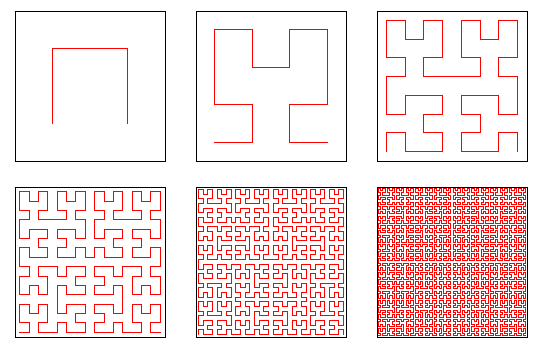
Hilbert curves.

In parallel processing, the Hilbert curve scheduling method turns a multidimensional task allocation problem into a one-dimensional space filling problem using Hilbert curves, assigning related tasks to locations with higher levels of proximity. Other space filling curves may also be used in various computing applications for similar purposes.

The SLURM job scheduler which is used on a number of supercomputers uses a best fit algorithm based on Hilbert curve scheduling in order to optimize locality of task assignments.

== See also ==
- Job scheduling
- Automate Schedule
- Supercomputer operating systems
