= CNK operating system =

Operating system

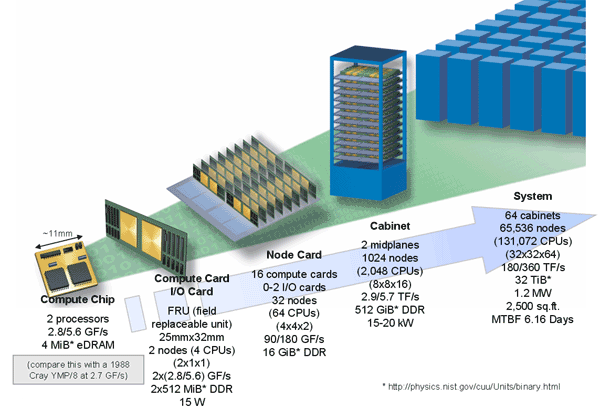
The IBM Blue Gene compute hierarchy. A CNK instance runs on each of the compute nodes.

Compute Node Kernel (CNK) is the node level operating system for the IBM Blue Gene series of supercomputers.

== Operating system ==
The compute nodes of the IBM Blue Gene family of supercomputers run CNK, a lightweight kernel that runs on each node and supports one application running for one user on that node. To maximize operating efficiency, the design of CNK was kept simple and minimal. It was implemented in about 5,000 lines of C++ code. Physical memory is statically mapped and the CNK neither needs nor provides scheduling or context switching, given that at each point it runs one application for one user. By not allowing virtual memory or multi-tasking, the design of CNK aimed to devote as many cycles as possible to application processing.

CNK delegates file input/output (I/O) to dedicated I/O nodes which run the INK (I/O Node Kernel) operating system, based on a modified Linux kernel.

== See also ==
- Catamount (operating system)
- Compute Node Linux
- INK (operating system)
- Rocks Cluster Distribution
- Timeline of operating systems
