= Rocks Cluster Distribution =

Linux-distro for high-performance computing clusters

- Developer: National Partnership for Advanced Computational Infrastructure, SDSC, UCSD
- OS family: Linux (Unix-like)
- Working state: Active
- Source model: Open source
- Latest release: 7.0 (Manzanita) / 1 December 2017; 8 years ago
- Available in: English
- Kernel type: Monolithic (Linux)
- License: Various
- Official website: www.rocksclusters.org

Rocks Cluster Distribution (originally NPACI Rocks) is a Linux distribution intended for high-performance computing (HPC) clusters. It was started by the National Partnership for Advanced Computational Infrastructure and the San Diego Supercomputer Center (SDSC) in 2000. It was initially funded in part by an NSF grant (2000–07), but was funded by the follow-up NSF grant through 2011.

== Distribution ==
Rocks was initially based on the Red Hat Linux (RHL) distribution, however modern versions of Rocks were based on CentOS, with a modified Anaconda installer that simplifies mass installation onto many computers. Rocks includes many tools (such as Message Passing Interface (MPI)) which are not part of CentOS but are integral components that make a group of computers into a cluster.

Installations can be customized with additional software packages at install-time by using special user-supplied CDs (called "Roll CDs"). The "Rolls" extend the system by integrating seamlessly and automatically into the management and packaging mechanisms used by base software, greatly simplifying installation and configuration of large numbers of computers. Over a dozen Rolls have been created, including the Sun Grid Engine (SGE) roll, the Condor roll, the Lustre roll, the Java roll, and the Ganglia roll.

By October 2010, Rocks was used for academic, government, and commercial organizations, employed in 1,376 clusters, on every continent except Antarctica. The largest registered academic cluster, having 8632 CPUs, is GridKa, operated by the Karlsruhe Institute of Technology in Karlsruhe, Germany. There are also a number of clusters ranging down to fewer than 10 CPUs, representing the early stages in the construction of larger systems, as well as being used for courses in cluster design. This easy scalability was a major goal in the development of Rocks, both for the researchers involved, and for the NSF:

Broader impact mirrors intellectual merit, and specifically lies in Rocks' new capabilities enabling management of very large clusters such as those emerging from the NSF Track 2 program, the ease of configuration of clusters supporting virtualization capabilities and generally the continuing effect of Rocks on installation and use of Linux clusters across NSF communities.

— SDCI: NMI: Improvement: The Rocks Cluster Toolkit and Extensions to Build User-Defined Cyberenvironments

== Release history ==
Release date	Rocks version	CentOS version
Dec 2017	Rocks 7.0	CentOS 7.4
May 2015	Rocks 6.2	CentOS 6.6
Apr 2014	Rocks 6.1.1	CentOS 6.5
Nov 2012	Rocks 6.1	CentOS 6.3

== See also ==
- Scientific Linux – a Linux distribution by Fermilab and CERN
- Cray Linux Environment
- Compute Node Linux
- CNK operating system
