= Catamount (operating system) =

Operating system for supercomputers

The Cray XT3 supercomputer which uses Catamount on its compute nodes

Catamount is an operating system for supercomputers.

Catamount is a lightweight kernel that provides basic functionality and aims for efficiency. The roots of Catamount go back to 1991 when SUNMOS was developed by Sandia National Laboratories and the University of New Mexico as a lightweight operating system. The Cray XT3 uses Catamount on compute nodes and Linux on server nodes.

A case study by the IEEE assessed the performance of a particle transport code on AWE's Cray XT3 8,000-core supercomputer while running images of the Catamount and the Cray Linux Environment (CLE) operating systems. This work demonstrated that by running a number of small benchmarks on a test machine it is possible to speculate as to the performance impact of upgrading from one operating system to another on the system as a whole. The study's findings enabled researchers to minimise system downtime while exploring software upgrades. The results show that benchmark tests run on less than 256 cores would suggest that the impact of upgrading the operating system to CLE was less than 10%.

== See also ==
- Compute Node Linux
- Cray XT3
- Cray Inc. supercomputers
- Timeline of operating systems
- CNK operating system
