= Cray XT3 =

Distributed memory massively parallel MIMD supercomputer

A Cray XT3 supercomputer at Oak Ridge National Laboratory

The Cray XT3, also known by codename Red Storm, is a distributed memory massively parallel MIMD supercomputer designed by Cray Inc.. Cray collaborated with and delivered to Sandia National Laboratories in 2004. The XT3 derives much of its architecture from the previous Cray T3E system, and also from the Intel ASCI Red supercomputer.

== History ==
Red Storm was developed in response to the request for information by Sandia's in 2001, Cray delivered on an approximately $90 million budget by 2004. In the same year, a commercial version called Cray XT3 was released, achieving a technical balance between computing, memory, network, and I/O operations. XT3 was superseded in 2006 by the Cray XT4 as the second iterations of XT.

== Architecture ==
Targeted to achieve long-running mathematical analysis, the system architecture was focused on high performance and fault tolerance. Red Storm was developed to offering customizable components and to scale by networking multiple cabinets together, each houses 96 processing elements, arranged in a 3-dimensional torus topology. This arrangement is optimized for shared tasks between neighboring processing elements, or nodes. Each set of cabinets forms a system which performs two primary tasks of either computation or service management.

Each element comprises a 2.4 or 2.6 GHz AMD Opteron processor with up to two cores, a custom "SeaStar" communications chip, and between 1 and 8 GB of RAM. The PowerPC 440 based SeaStar device provides a 6.4 GB/s connection to the processor across HyperTransport, as well as six 7.6 GB/s links to neighboring elements.

The XT3 system runs an operating system called UNICOS/lc, and with the file system leveraging Lustre. In UNICOS/lc 1.x, the Compute PEs run a Sandia developed microkernel called Catamount, which is descended from the SUNMOS OS of the Intel Paragon; in UNICOS/lc 2.0, Catamount was replaced by a specially tuned version of Linux called Compute Node Linux (CNL). Service and IO PEs run the full version of SuSE Linux and are used for interactive logins, systems management, application compiling and job launch. I/O PEs use physically distinct hardware, in that the node boards include PCI-X slots for connections to Ethernet and Fibre Channel networks.

Though the performance of each XT3 model will vary with the speed and number of processors installed, the November 2007 Top500 results for the Red Storm machine, the largest XT3 machine installed at Sandia, measured 102.7 teraflops on the Linpack benchmark, placing it at #6 on the list. After upgrades in 2008 to install some XT4 nodes with quad-core Opterons, Red Storm achieved 248 teraflops to place at #9 on the November 2008 Top500.
