= UNICOS =

- Developer: Cray Research
- Written in: Assembly, C
- OS family: Unix and Linux
- Working state: Discontinued
- Source model: Closed source and Open source
- Initial release: 1984; 41 years ago
- Marketing target: Supercomputers
- Available in: English
- Platforms: Monolithic kernel: Cray-1, 2, X-MP, X1, XT3, XT4, XT5; Microkernel: Y-MP, C90, T3D, T3E
- Kernel type: Monolithic (some); Microkernel (some)
- Default user interface: Command line interface
- License: Proprietary
- Preceded by: CX-OS; Cray Operating System (COS)
- Succeeded by: Cray Linux Environment
- Official website: www.cray.com

UNICOS is a range of Unix and later Linux operating system (OS) variants developed by Cray for its supercomputers. UNICOS is the successor of the Cray Operating System (COS). It provides network clustering and source code compatibility layers for some other Unixes. UNICOS was originally introduced in 1985 with the Cray-2 system and later ported to other Cray models. The original UNICOS was based on UNIX System V Release 2, and had many Berkeley Software Distribution (BSD) features (e.g., computer networking and file system enhancements) added to it.

== Development ==
CX-OS was the original name given to what is now UNICOS. This was a prototype system which ran on a Cray X-MP in 1984 before the Cray-2 port. It was used to demonstrate the feasibility of using Unix on a supercomputer system, before Cray-2 hardware was available.

The operating system revamp was part of a larger movement inside Cray Research to modernize their corporate software: including rewriting their most important Fortran compiler (cft to cft77) in a higher-level language (Pascal) with more modern optimizations and vectorizations.

As a migration path for existing COS customers wishing to transition to UNICOS, a Guest Operating System (GOS) capability was introduced into COS. The only guest OS that was ever supported was UNICOS. A COS batch job would be submitted to start up UNICOS, which would then run as a subsystem under COS, using a subset of the systems CPUs, memory, and peripheral devices. The UNICOS that ran under GOS was exactly the same as when it ran stand-alone: the difference was that the kernel would make certain low-level hardware requests through the COS GOS hook, rather than directly to the hardware.

One of the sites that ran very early versions of UNICOS was Bell Labs, where Unix pioneers including Dennis Ritchie ported parts of their Eighth Edition Unix (including STREAMS input/output (I/O)) to UNICOS. They also experimented with a guest facility within UNICOS, allowing the stand-alone version of the OS to host itself.

== Releases ==
Cray released several different OSs under the name UNICOS, including:

1. UNICOS: the original Cray Unix, based on System V. Used on the Cray-1, Cray-2, X-MP, Y-MP, C90, etc.
2. UNICOS MAX: a Mach-based microkernel used on the T3D's processing elements, together with UNICOS on the host Y-MP or C90 system.
3. UNICOS/mk: a serverized version of UNICOS using the Chorus microkernel to make a distributed operating system. Used on the T3E. This was the last Cray OS really based on UNICOS sources, as the following products were based on different sources and simply used the "UNICOS" name.
4. UNICOS/mp: not derived from UNICOS, but based on IRIX 6.5. Used on the X1.
5. UNICOS/lc: not derived from UNICOS, but based on SUSE Linux. Used on the XT3, XT4 and XT5. UNICOS/lc 1.x comprises a combination of
  1. the compute elements run the Catamount microkernel (which itself is based on Cougaar)
  2. the service elements run SUSE Linux
6. Cray Linux Environment (CLE): from release 2.1 onward, UNICOS/lc is now called Cray Linux Environment
  1. the compute elements run Compute Node Linux (CNL) (which is a customized Linux kernel)
  2. the service elements run SUSE Linux Enterprise Server

== See also ==
- Scientific Linux, a Linux distribution by Fermilab and CERN
- Rocks Cluster Distribution, a Linux distribution for supercomputers
