= Compute Node Linux =

Runtime environment for Cray supercomputer systems

Compute Node Linux (CNL) is a runtime environment based on the Linux kernel for the Cray XT3, Cray XT4, Cray XT5, Cray XT6, Cray XE6 and Cray XK6 supercomputer systems based on SUSE Linux Enterprise Server. CNL forms part of the Cray Linux Environment. As of November 2011 systems running CNL were ranked 3rd, 6th and 8th among the fastest supercomputers in the world.

== See also ==
- INK (operating system)
