= Cray XT4 =

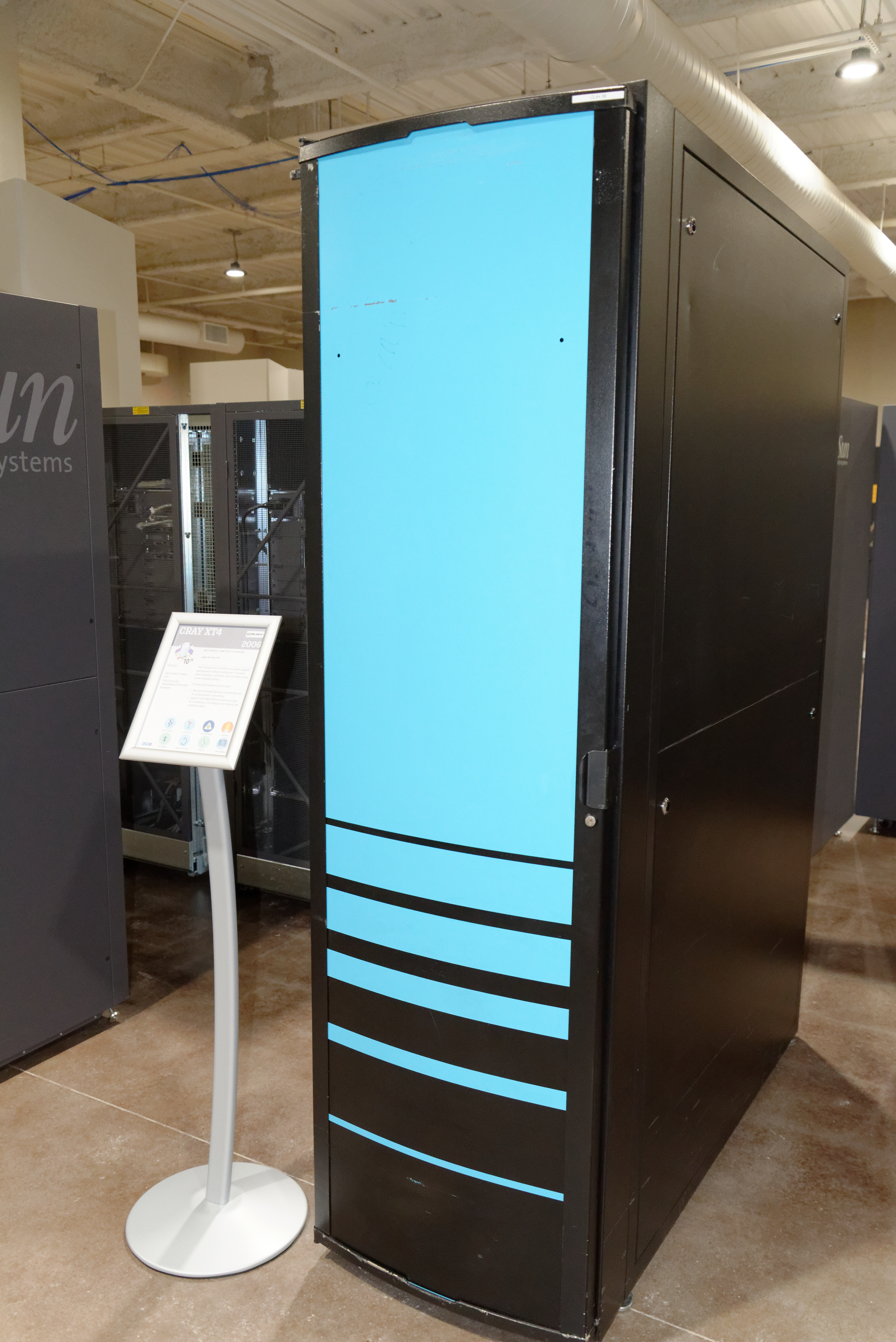

The Cray XT4 (codenamed Hood during development) is an updated version of the Cray XT3 supercomputer. It was released on November 18, 2006. It includes an updated version of the SeaStar interconnect router called SeaStar2, processor sockets for Socket AM2 Opteron processors, and 240-pin unbuffered DDR2 memory. The XT4 also includes support for FPGA coprocessors that plug into riser cards in the Service and IO blades. The interconnect, cabinet, system software and programming environment remain unchanged from the Cray XT3. It was superseded in 2007 by the Cray XT5.
