= Supertek Computers =

American computer company

Supertek Computers Inc.
- Company type: Public
- Industry: Computer
- Founded: 1985; 40 years ago
- Founder: Mike Fung
- Defunct: 1990; 35 years ago
- Fate: Acquired by Cray
- Products: Supertek S-1

Supertek Computers Inc. was a computer company founded in Santa Clara, California in 1985 by Mike Fung, an ex-Hewlett-Packard project manager, with the aim of designing and selling low-cost minisupercomputers compatible with those from Cray Research.

Its first product was the Supertek S-1, a compact, air-cooled, CMOS clone of the Cray X-MP vector processor supercomputer running the CTSS (Cray Time Sharing System) operating system, and later a version of Unix. This was launched in 1989; although Supertek had raised US$21.4 million in venture capital, only $5 million of this was needed to develop the S-1. Only ten units were sold before Supertek was acquired by Cray Research in 1990. The S-1 was subsequently sold for a brief time by Cray as the Cray XMS.

At the time of the acquisition the Supertek S-2, a clone of the Cray Y-MP, was under development. This was eventually launched as the Cray Y-MP EL in 1992.
