= Cray Time Sharing System =

Cray Time Sharing System (CTSS)
- Developer: Los Alamos Scientific Laboratory, Lawrence Livermore Laboratory
- Working state: Historic
- Initial release: 1978; 48 years ago
- Marketing target: Supercomputers
- Available in: English
- Supported platforms: Cray-1, Cray X-MP line
- License: Proprietary
- Preceded by: Livermore Time Sharing System

The Cray Time Sharing System, also known in the Cray user community as CTSS, was developed as an operating system for the Cray-1 or Cray X-MP line of supercomputers in 1978. CTSS was developed by the Los Alamos Scientific Laboratory (LASL now LANL) in conjunction with the Lawrence Livermore Laboratory (LLL now LLNL). CTSS was popular with Cray sites in the United States Department of Energy (DOE), but was used by several other Cray sites, such as the San Diego Supercomputing Center.

== Overview ==
The predecessor of CTSS was the Livermore Time Sharing System (LTSS) which ran on Control Data CDC 7600 line of supercomputers. The first compiler was known as LRLTRAN, for Lawrence Radiation Laboratory forTRAN, a FORTRAN 66 programming language but with dynamic memory and other features. The Cray version, including automatic vectorization, was known as CVC, pronounced "Civic" like the Honda car of the period, for Cray Vector Compiler.

Some controversy existed at LASL with the first attempt to develop an operating system for the Cray-1 named DEIMOS, a message-passing, Unix-like operating system, by Forest Baskett. DEIMOS had initial "teething" problems common to the performance of all early operating systems. This left a bad taste for Unix-like systems at the National Laboratories and with the manufacturer, Cray Research, Inc., of the hardware who went on to develop their own batch oriented operating system, COS (Cray Operating System) and their own vectorizing Fortran compiler named "CFT" (Cray ForTran) both written in the Cray Assembly Language (CAL).

CTSS had the misfortune to have certain constants, structures, and lacking certain networking facilities (TCP/IP) which were optimized to be Cray-1 architecture-dependent without extensive rework when larger memory supercomputers like the Cray-2 and the Cray Y-MP came into use. CTSS has its final breaths running on Cray instruction-set-compatible hardware developed by Scientific Computer Systems (SCS-40 and SCS-30) and Supertek S-1, but this did not save the software.

CTSS embodied certain unique ideas such as a market-driven priorities for working/running processes.

An attempt to succeed CTSS was started by LLNL named NLTSS (New Livermore Time Sharing System) to embody advanced concepts for operating systems to better integrate communication using a new network protocol named LINCS while also keeping the best features of CTSS. NLTSS followed the development fate of many operating systems and only briefly ran on period Cray hardware of the late 1980s.

A user-level CTSS Overview from 1982 provides, in Chapter 2, a brief list of CTSS features. Other references are likely to be found in proceedings of the Cray User Group (CUG) and the ACM SOSP (Symp. on Operating Systems Proceedings). However, as LANL and LLNL were nuclear weapons facilities, some aspects of security are likely to doom finding out greater detail of many of these pieces of software.

== See also ==
- EOS (operating system)
- Timeline of operating systems
