= Steve Chen (computer engineer) =

Steve S. Chen
- 陳世卿
- Born: 1944 (age 81–82); Taiwan
- Education: National Taiwan University (BS); Villanova University (MS); University of Illinois at Urbana-Champaign (PhD)
- Known for: Cray X-MP and Cray Y-MP
- Scientific career
- Fields: Computer science Electrical engineering
- Workplaces: Cray Research
- Thesis: Speedup of Interactive Programs in Multiprocessing Systems (1975)
- Doctoral advisor: David Kuck

Steve Chen (Chinese: 陳世卿; pinyin: Chén Shìqīng; born 1944) is a Taiwanese computer engineer and internet entrepreneur.

Chen was elected to the US National Academy of Engineering in 1991 for leadership in the development of super-computer architectures and their realization.

== Education ==
Chen earned a Bachelor of Science (B.S.) from National Taiwan University in 1966, a Master of Science (M.S.) from Villanova University in 1971 and a Ph.D. under David Kuck from the University of Illinois at Urbana-Champaign in 1975.

== Career ==
From 1975 through 1978 he worked for Burroughs Corporation on the design of the Burroughs large systems line of supercomputers. He is best known as the principal designer of the Cray X-MP and Cray Y-MP multiprocessor supercomputers. Chen left Cray Research in September 1987 after it dropped the MP line.

With IBM's financial support, Chen founded Supercomputer Systems Incorporated (SSI) in January 1988. SSI was devoted to development of the SS-1 supercomputer, which was nearly completed before the estimated $150 million investment ran out. The Eau Claire, Wisconsin-based company went bankrupt in early 1993, leaving more than 300 employees jobless.

An attempt to salvage the work was made by forming a new company, SuperComputer International (SCI), later that year. SCI was renamed Chen Systems in 1995. It was acquired by Sequent Computer Systems the following year. John Markoff, a technology journalist, wrote in the New York Times that Chen was considered "one of the nation's most brilliant supercomputer designers while working in this country for the technology pioneer Seymour Cray in the 1980s."

In 1999, Chen became founder and CEO of Galactic Computing, a developer of supercomputing blade systems, based in Shenzhen, China. At Tonbu, Inc., his team designed and implemented the world's first fully scalable cloud computing system. A fully scalable dynamic process and application engine.

By 2005 he started to focus on grid computing to model a human brain instead.

By 2010, he was reported to be working on technology to use cloud computing to improve health care in rural China.

In 2011, he founded Information Supergrid Technologies USA.

== See also ==
- Taiwanese Americans
