= Cray Y-MP =

Supercomputer by Cray Research

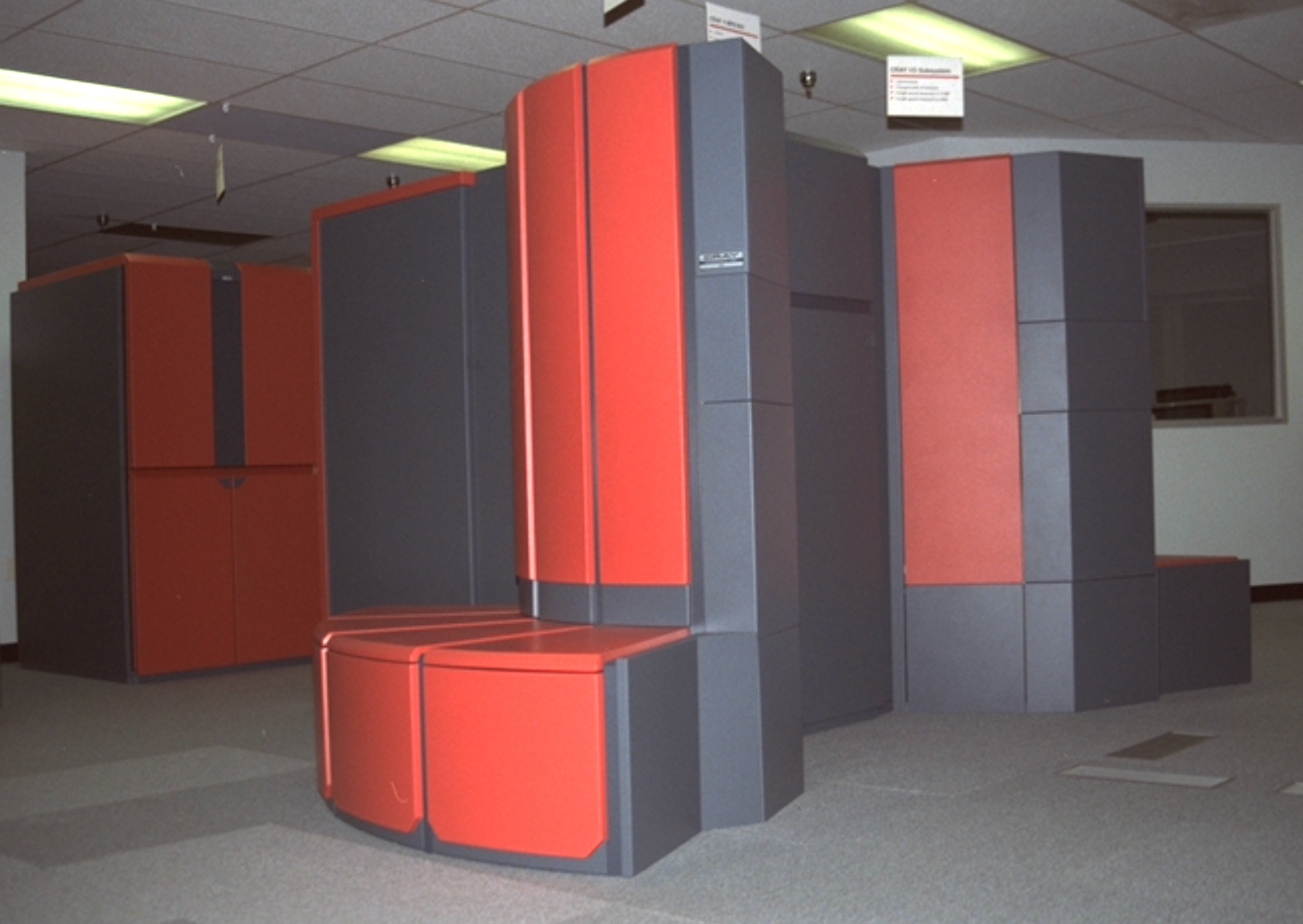
- Cray Y-MP Model D at NASA Center for Computational Sciences, GSFC

Design
- Manufacturer: Cray Research
- Designer: Steve Chen and Les Davis
- Release date: 1988
- Price: $20 million for the original 8-processor model

System
- Front-end: Most minicomputers of the time
- Operating system: COS, UNICOS
- CPU: 1 to 8 vector processor 64 bits @ 167 MHz (6 ns cycle)
- MIPS: 333 MIPS per processor
- FLOPS: 2.667 GFLOPS (8 CPU)
- Predecessor: Cray C90

The Cray Y-MP was a supercomputer sold by Cray Research from 1988, and the successor to the company's X-MP. The Y-MP retained software compatibility with the X-MP, but extended the address registers from 24 to 32 bits. High-density VLSI emitter-coupled logic (ECL) technology was used and a new liquid-cooling system was devised. The Y-MP ran the Cray UNICOS operating system.

The Y-MP could be equipped with two, four or eight vector processors, with two functional units each and a clock cycle time of 6 ns (167 MHz). Peak performance was thus 333 megaflops per processor. Main memory comprised 256, 512, or 1024 MB of SRAM. (Memory was measured and allocated in 64-bit words, and offered in 32, 64, or 128 MWords).

The original Y-MP (otherwise known as the Y-MP Model D) was housed in a chassis similar to the horseshoe-shaped X-MP, but with an extra rectangular cabinet added in the middle (containing the CPU boards), thus forming a "Y" shape in plan view. The system could be configured with one or two Model D IOSs (Input/Output Subsystems) and an optional Solid State Disk (SSD) of 256 MB to 4GB capacity. The Y-MP had a measured GFLOPS of 2.144 and a peak GFLOPS of 2.667 in both 1988 and 1989.

The Model D Y-MP was superseded in 1990 by the Y-MP Model E, which replaced IOS Model D with IOS Model E, providing twice the I/O throughput. The Y-shaped chassis was dropped in favor of one or two rectangular cabinets (each with a separate connected cabinet containing the liquid-cooling system), depending on configuration. Maximum RAM was increased to 2 GB and up to eight IOSs were possible. Model E variants included the Y-MP 2E, Y-MP 4E, Y-MP 8E and Y-MP 8I, the latter being a single-cabinet (I for Integrated) version of the two-cabinet 8E. The 2E and 4E were later available with optional secondary air cooling.

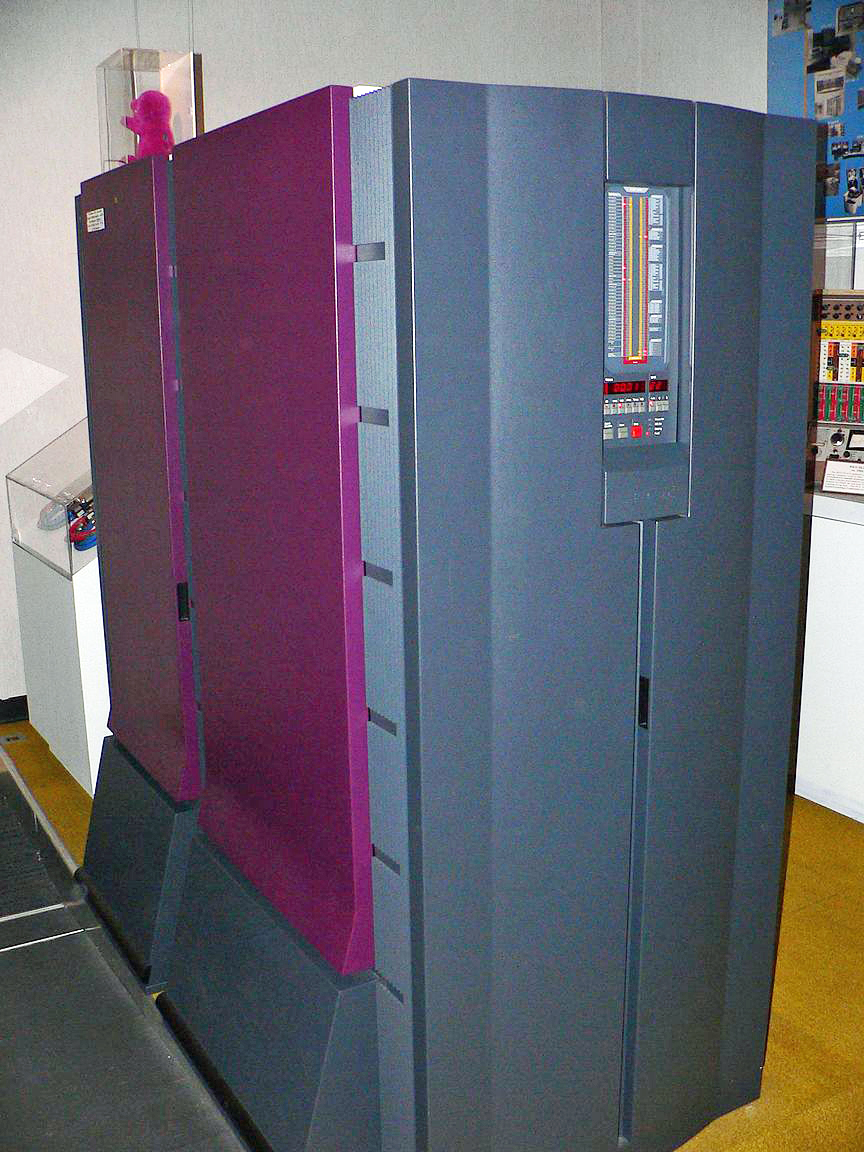
Cray Y-MP M90 (Ziegler) at the US National Cryptologic Museum

The Y-MP M90 was a large-memory variant of the Y-MP Model E introduced in 1992. This replaced the SRAM of the Y-MP with up to 32 GB of slower, but physically smaller DRAM devices. The Y-MP M90 was also available in variants with up to two, four or eight processors (M92, M94 and M98 respectively). Later, the model name was abbreviated to the Cray M90 series.

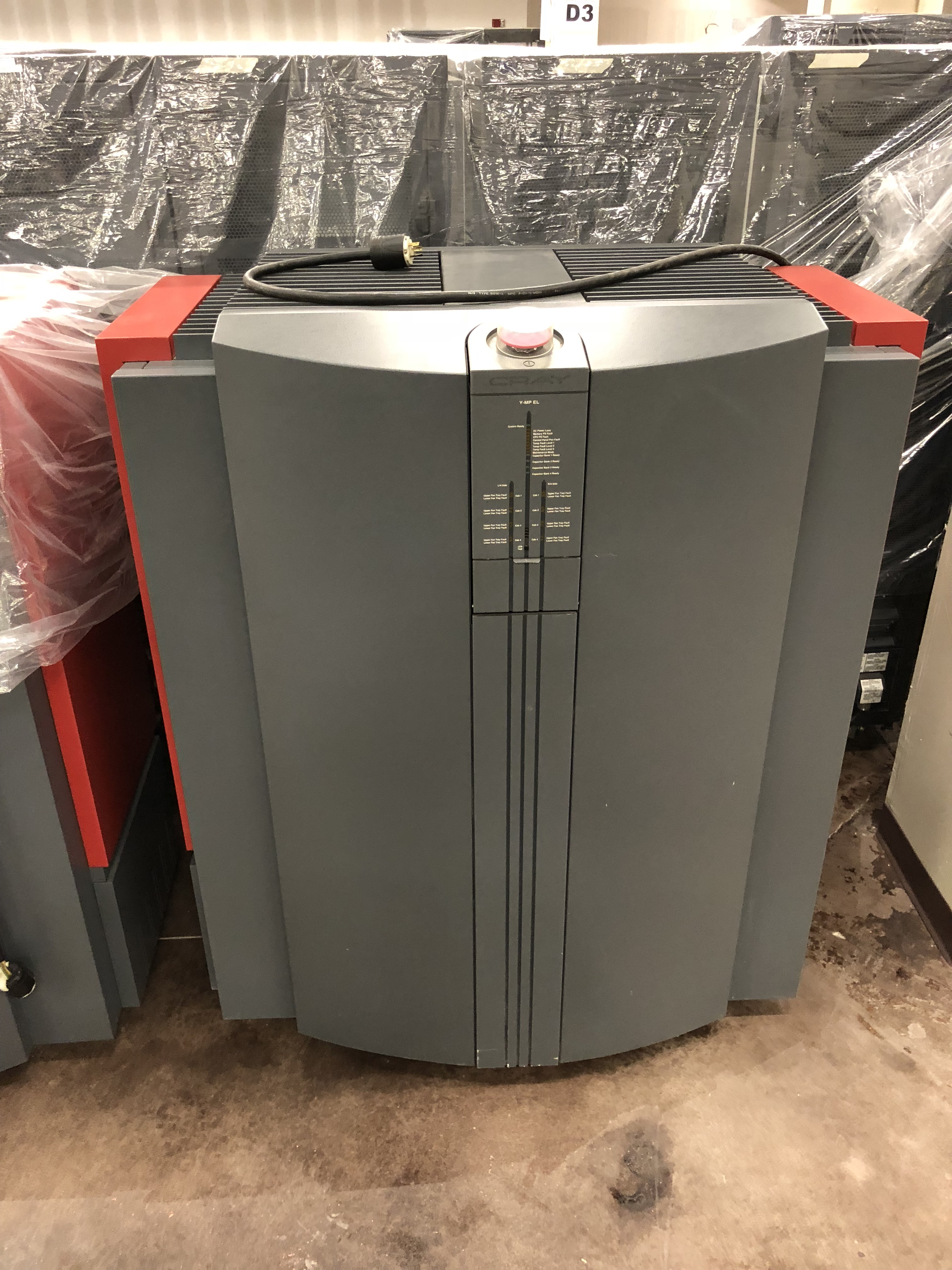
Cray Y-MP EL

The Y-MP C90 series is described separately.

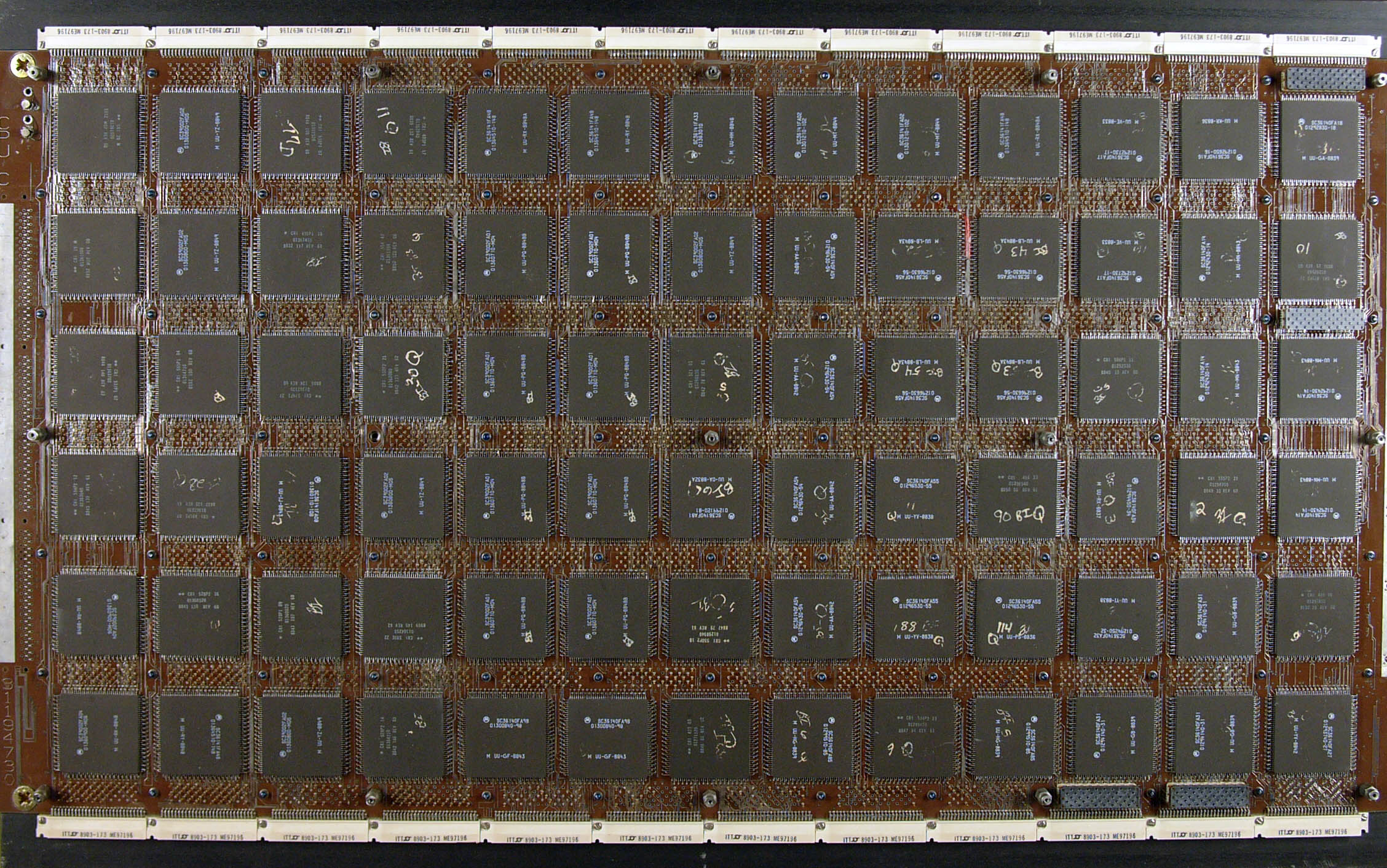
Cray Y-MP processor board

In 1992, Cray launched the cheaper Y-MP EL (Entry Level) model. This was a reimplementation of the Y-MP architecture in CMOS technology, based on the S-2 design acquired by Cray from Supertek Computers in 1990. The EL was an air-cooled system with a completely different VMEbus-based IOS. EL configurations with up to four processors (each with a peak performance of 133 megaflops) and 32 MB to 1 GB of DRAM were available. The Y-MP EL was later developed into the Cray EL90 series (EL92, EL94 and EL98).

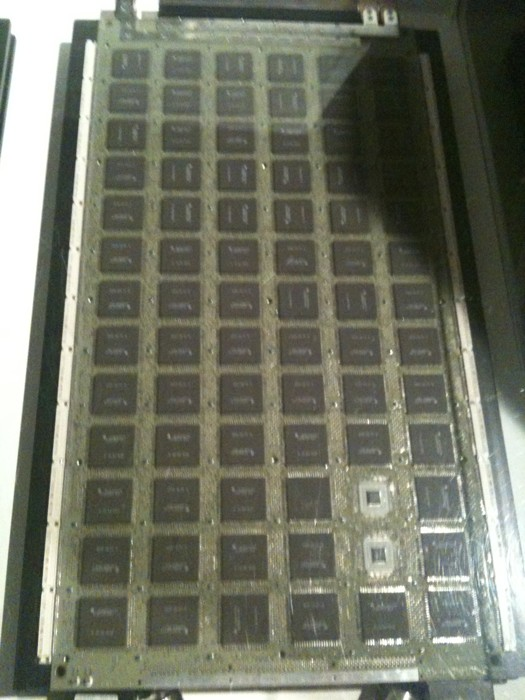
Y-MP M90 board at the National Cryptologic Museum

The Y-MP EL came in a cabinet much smaller than the traditional room-filling Cray 2010×1270×810 mm (height × width × depth) and 635 kg in weight—and could be powered from regular mains power.

== In popular culture ==
In the 1992 film Sneakers, whose story is centered around extremely high-level cryptography, two lead characters have an important discussion while sitting on a Cray Y-MP.

In an episode of the television dramedy Northern Exposure titled "Nothing's Perfect", a character expresses her excitement at having finally gained access to a "CRAY Y-MP3" supercomputer.

Records
Preceded by Cray-2; 1.95 gigaflops (peak)	World's most powerful supercomputer 1988–1989	Succeeded by Fujitsu VP2600/10; 4.0 gigaflops (measured)
