= Livermore Time Sharing System =

Livermore Time Sharing System (LTSS)
- Developer: Lawrence Livermore Laboratories
- Working state: Historic
- Initial release: 1965; 60 years ago
- Marketing target: Supercomputing
- Platforms: CDC 6600 and CDC 7600
- License: Proprietary
- Succeeded by: Cray Time Sharing System

The Livermore Time Sharing System (LTSS) was a supercomputer operating system originally developed by the Lawrence Livermore Laboratories for the Control Data Corporation 6600 and 7600 series of supercomputers in 1965.

LTSS resulted in the Cray Time Sharing System and then the Network Livermore Timesharing System (NLTSS).

== See also ==
- UNICOS
