= Cray EL90 =

Supercomputer by Cray Research

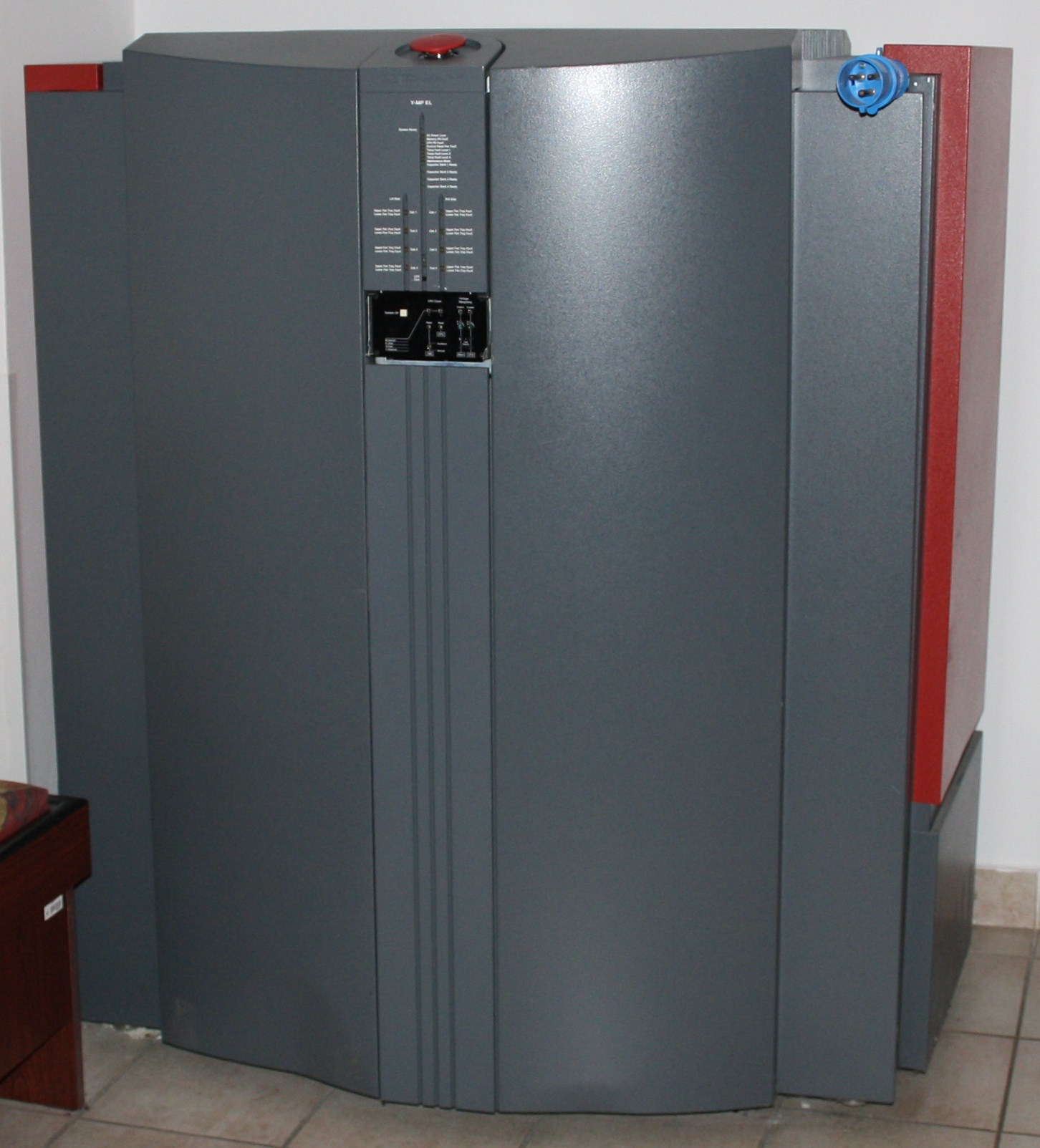
Cray EL98 at Masaryk University

The Cray EL90 series was an air-cooled vector processor supercomputer first sold by Cray Research in 1993. The EL90 series evolved from the Cray Y-MP EL minisupercomputer, and is compatible with Y-MP software, running the same UNICOS operating system. The range comprised three models:

- EL92, with up to two processors and 64 megawords (512 MB) of DRAM in a deskside chassis: dimensions 42×23.5×26 inches or 1050×600×670 mm (height × width × depth) and 380 lb/172 kg in weight.
- EL94, with up to four processors and 64 megawords (512 MB) of DRAM, in the same cabinet as the EL92.
- EL98, a revised Y-MP EL with up to eight processors and 256 megawords (2 GB) of DRAM in a Y-MP EL-style cabinet (62×50×32 inches or 2010×1270×810 mm, 1400 lb/635 kg in weight).

The EL90 series Input/Output Subsystem (IOS) was based on the VMEbus and a Heurikon HK68 Motorola 68000-based processor board (or IOP). The IOP also provided the system's serial console. Extra cabinets could be added to house extra disks. Larger EL90 models consumed 6 kVa per cabinet and could be powered from regular machine room mains power.

The EL90 series was superseded by the Cray J90 series.
