= Luis M. Proenza =

American academic

15th President of The University of Akron
- In office 1999 – June 30, 2014
- Preceded by: Marion A. Ruebel
- Succeeded by: Scott L. Scarborough

Personal details
- Born: Luis Mariano Proenza; December 22, 1944 (age 81) Mexico
- Profession: Educator

Luis Mariano Proenza (born December 22, 1944, Mexico City, Mexico) is a Mexican-American academic administrator, neuroscientist, and science policy advisor. He served as the 15th President of the University of Akron, Ohio, from 1999 to June 30, 2014.

A researcher in retinal neurophysiology by training, Proenza held senior administrative positions at the University of Georgia, the University of Alaska, and Purdue University before his appointment at Akron. He was appointed to the President's Council of Advisors on Science and Technology (PCAST) by President George W. Bush in 2001, serving until 2008, and was subsequently appointed to the Advanced Manufacturing Partnership Steering Committee 2.0 (AMP2.0) by President Barack Obama in 2013.

== Early life ==
Proenza was born in Mexico City, Mexico, to Luis Proenza Abreu, a Cuban-born immigrant, and Sara Gonzalez de Proenza, a Mexican national. He spent his earliest years in Mexico City before the family relocated, first to Cuernavaca and then to Acapulco. His father had emigrated from Cuba to New York City in 1920 and later settled in Mexico, where his parents established a silver jewelry business called Plata de Taxco at the Mexico City Airport, later opening a second location in Acapulco.

His mother co-founded two orphanages, including Nuestros Pequeños Hermanos in Cuernavaca. At the age of eleven, in 1956, Proenza relocated to the United States to attend Riverside Military Academy, a boarding school in Gainesville, Georgia. He remained there through high school, rising to the rank of commanding cadet colonel, the highest cadet rank at the school. He was subsequently named a Notable Alumnus by Riverside Military Academy.

== Education ==
Proenza enrolled at Emory University in Atlanta, Georgia, in 1962, initially on a pre-medical track. He shifted his focus to psychology under the mentorship of Dr. Bonnie R. Strickland, who later became president of the American Psychological Association. He completed his Bachelor of Arts in psychology in 1965.

He then enrolled in the clinical psychology program at Ohio State University, completing his Master of Arts in 1966. He subsequently taught briefly at the University of the Americas in Mexico City before returning to the United States to pursue doctoral study at the University of Minnesota at the invitation of Dr. Starke R. Hathaway, co-developer of the Minnesota Multiphasic Personality Inventory.

Proenza began his doctoral work at Minnesota in 1968, conducting research on retinal neurophysiology under the supervision of Dr. Dwight Burkhardt. His doctoral thesis examined the proximal negative response and retinal sensitivity in the mudpuppy (Necturus maculosus). He completed his Doctor of Philosophy in 1971. He subsequently undertook a postdoctoral fellowship at the University of Utah under Dr. Thomas H. Ogden, continuing research on retinal function.

== Academic and administrative career ==
=== University of Georgia (1971–1987) ===
He organized the University of Georgia's first program in neurobiology, serving as its coordinator from 1975 to 1987, and helped establish the university's chapter of the Society for Neuroscience.

During this period he held administrative responsibilities. In 1983, he received an ACE Fellowship in Academic Administration from the American Council on Education, one of the nation's most prestigious higher education leadership development programs, which he completed concurrently with his appointment as Assistant to the President (1984–1986). He subsequently served as the university's Liaison for Science and Technology Policy (1986–1987).

=== University of Alaska (1987–1994) ===
During this period, Proenza secured a five-year, $20-million National Science Foundation contract for the Polar Ice Coring Office (PICO), providing technical and logistical support for ice-core drilling in Greenland and Antarctica. He also secured a $25-million US Army Corps of Engineers grant to establish the Arctic Region Supercomputing Center.

He served as Founding President of the Arctic Research Consortium of the United States (ARCUS) from 1988 to 1990, having been one of three co-authors of the founding prospectus for the organization alongside Mark Meier and Norbert Untersteiner. He subsequently served as Vice Chairman and Commissioner of the United States Arctic Research Commission, appointed by President George H. W. Bush in 1992.

He also served on the National Biotechnology Policy Board from 1990 to 1993, appointed by the Secretary of Health and Human Services, and as Science and Technology Policy Advisor to Alaska Governor Walter J. Hickel from 1991 to 1994.

=== Purdue University (1994–1999) ===
He served on the Executive Committee of the Association of Graduate Schools (AGS) within the Association of American Universities (AAU), representing Purdue from 1994 to 1998.

=== University of Akron (1999–2014) ===
Proenza was appointed the 15th President of the University of Akron in 1999. During his fifteen-year tenure, the university's annual revenues grew from approximately $270 million to over $435 million and the research portfolio more than doubled. Private donations rose to all-time records, and in 2007 Proenza initiated a $500-million comprehensive fundraising campaign that raised more than $620 million in gifts and pledges by the end of 2009.

Under his presidency, the university's "New Landscape for Learning" initiative added 21 new buildings, undertook 18 major renovations, and created 34 acres of new green space. He led two major community initiatives: the University Park Alliance, a multi-partner effort to revitalize a 50-block area surrounding the campus, supported by a $2.5-million Knight Foundation grant in 2001; and the Austen BioInnovation Institute in Akron, launched in 2008 with a $20-million Knight Foundation grant as a partnership with three area hospitals and a medical school to advance biomaterials research.

During his tenure, Proenza championed the creation of the National Polymer Innovation Center (NPIC), established as a partnership between the University's School of Polymer Science and Polymer Engineering and a number of polymer related companies. Separately, he oversaw the establishment of the Timken Engineered Surfaces Laboratory (TESL), a $5-million open-innovation facility in which Timken researchers and University of Akron faculty were co-located in the College of Engineering to conduct joint research in surface engineering and tribology.

He also oversaw the formation of the National Center for Education and Research on Corrosion and Materials Performance (NCERCAMP), a partnership between the University of Akron and the United States Department of Defense, which led to the establishment of the nation's first baccalaureate degree program in corrosion engineering.

In 2001, Proenza oversaw the establishment of the University of Akron Research Foundation (UARF), a non-profit organization created to promote and support university and industry collaboration and to provide mechanisms by which discoveries and inventions developed at the university are commercialized. UARF subsequently became a focal point of regional entrepreneurial activity, facilitating the launch of dozens of startup companies based on university-patented technology.

The approach to university-led regional economic development pursued under Proenza's presidency became known as the "Akron Model," documented as a case study in a 2013 report by the National Academy of Sciences titled Best Practices in State and Regional Innovation Initiatives: Competing in the 21st Century. The report described the University of Akron's approach to creating multi-way pipelines of intellectual property between the university and industry partners, targeting regional industry clusters in polymer science and biomaterials, and forging institutional partnerships to drive urban revitalization.

In 2014, three regional organizations recognized Proenza's contributions: the Greater Akron Chamber awarded him its H. Peter Burg Economic Leadership Award; Team Northeast Ohio honored him with its H. Peter Burg Regional Vision Award at its annual Economic Development Plus Awards ceremony; and he was inducted into the Northeast Ohio Business Hall of Fame.

He stepped down as president on June 30, 2014, and was designated President Emeritus.

== Science and technology policy ==
In 2001, President George W. Bush appointed Proenza to the President's Council of Advisors on Science and Technology (PCAST), the nation's highest-level science and technology advisory body, where he served until 2008. On PCAST, Proenza co-chaired the committee on Public-Private Partnerships and participated in working panels covering research and development investment, technology transfer, alternative energy, energy efficiency, advanced manufacturing, personalized medicine, information technology, and nanotechnology. In 2004, the Secretary of Energy appointed him chairman of the Science and Mathematics Education Task Force and subsequently to the Secretary of Energy Advisory Board.

In September 2013, President Barack Obama appointed Proenza to the Advanced Manufacturing Partnership Steering Committee 2.0 (AMP2.0), a working group established to strengthen United States leadership in advanced manufacturing.

Proenza's involvement with the Council on Competitiveness began at the organization's founding in 1986 and extended to 2016. He formally joined the Council as president of the University of Akron in 2000, was named to its Executive Committee in 2008, and served in that capacity until 2014, when he was designated a Fellow and subsequently a Distinguished Fellow of the Council. Among the major initiatives in which he participated were the National Innovation Initiative Leadership Council, the National Innovation Initiative Advisory Committee (2004), the co-chairmanship of the National Innovation Initiative Innovation Environment and Infrastructure Working Group (2004), and the National Steering Committee for Clusters of Innovation: The Regional Basis of U.S. Competitiveness (1999–2001).

He also served on the Board on Science, Technology, and Economic Policy at the National Academies from 2010 to 2014, the Government-University-Industry Research Roundtable of the National Academies from 2009 to 2014, and the Technology Innovation Program Advisory Board at the National Institute of Standards and Technology in 2009. He co-chaired the National Academies planning committee for the workshop "Revisiting the Manufacturing USA Institutes," and chaired the planning committee for the workshop "Advancing Economic Development and Workforce Readiness in Micropolitan Areas." He also served on the Ohio Governor's Third Frontier Advisory Board, appointed by Governor Bob Taft, from 2003 to 2008. He is a member of the Council on Foreign Relations.

== Research ==
Proenza's academic research focused on the neurophysiology of the vertebrate retina, specifically the mechanisms of retinal signal processing, the dynamics of extracellular potassium flux, and the role of Muller (glial) cells in the generation of electroretinographic components. His doctoral research with Dwight Burkhardt at Minnesota produced the first characterization of the proximal negative response in the mudpuppy retina, published in the Journal of Neurophysiology in 1973.

His subsequent work at the University of Georgia with co-investigator Chester J. Karwoski produced a widely cited series of papers in the Journal of Neurophysiology and the Journal of General Physiology, documenting light-evoked changes in extracellular potassium concentration and their relationship to the electroretinogram. This research has been cited in peer-reviewed publications in Visual Neuroscience and related journals over several decades.

He co-edited two books: Clinical Applications of Visual Psychophysics (Cambridge University Press, 1981, with Enoch and Jampolski) and Nutrition, Pharmacology, and Vision (in Retina, 1982, with Dowling and Atwell). His article "Relevance, Connectivity, and Productivity: Three Paths to Innovation in Higher Education" was published in Innovations: Technology, Governance, Globalization (MIT Press), vol. 5(2), April 2010.

He also contributed to higher education policy discourse through a commentary published in Inside Higher Ed in May 2007, arguing for new frameworks to measure research competitiveness and productivity at universities beyond simple grant totals.

== Awards and recognition ==
- 1983: ACE Fellowship in Academic Administration, American Council on Education
- 1992: Appointed Commissioner, United States Arctic Research Commission, by President George H. W. Bush
- 2001: Appointed to PCAST by President George W. Bush
- 2001: Executive of the Year, Sales and Marketing Executives of Akron
- 2002: Elected to membership, Council on Foreign Relations
- 2003: Honored by The Newcomen Society, Cleveland, Ohio
- 2004–2011: Named to the Inside Business Power 100 (Northeast Ohio), reaching number 18 in 2011
- 2004–2014: Member, Executive Committee, Council on Competitiveness
- 2005: Chief Executive Leadership Award, Council for Advancement and Support of Education (CASE), District V
- 2006: Northeast Ohio Regional Vision Award
- 2008: Visionary Award, Smart Business
- 2013: Appointed to AMP2.0 by President Barack Obama
- 2014: H. Peter Burg Economic Leadership Award, Greater Akron Chamber
- 2014: H. Peter Burg Regional Vision Award, Team Northeast Ohio Economic Development Plus Awards
- 2014: Induction, Northeast Ohio Business Hall of Fame
- Designated Distinguished Fellow, Council on Competitiveness
- Notable Alumni designation, Riverside Military Academy

== Personal life ==
Proenza met his wife, Theresa Butler, at the University of Georgia. Together they built a 44-foot sailing vessel, Apogee, which they have sailed on Lake Erie, Lake Huron, and the Chesapeake Bay. His interest in sailing began during his graduate studies at the University of Minnesota, where he first learned to sail on Lake Minnetonka.
