= Cray XMS =

1990 minisupercomputer

The Cray XMS was a vector processor minisupercomputer sold by Cray Research from 1990 to 1991. The XMS was originally designed by Supertek Computers Inc. as the Supertek S-1, intended to be a low-cost air-cooled clone of the Cray X-MP with a CMOS re-implementation of the X-MP processor architecture, and a VMEbus-based Input/Output Subsystem (IOS). The XMS could run Cray's UNICOS operating system. Supertek were acquired by Cray Research in 1990, and the S-1 was rebadged XMS by Cray. Its processor had a 55 ns clock period (18.2 MHz clock frequency) and 16 megawords (128 MB) of memory.

The CRAY XMS system was the first CRI computer system to be supported by removable disk drives.

Serial 5011, on display, was used for marketing purposes in the Eastern Region. It traveled for over 80,000 miles during its short working life and appeared at many trade shows.

The XMS was a short-lived model, and was superseded by the Cray Y-MP EL, which was under development by Supertek (as the Supertek S-2 and briefly as the Cray YMS) at the time of the Cray acquisition.

Though powerful for its time, the CRAY XMS only had half the processing power of Microsoft's original Xbox gaming console.
