= Cray X1 =

Supercomputer made starting in 2003

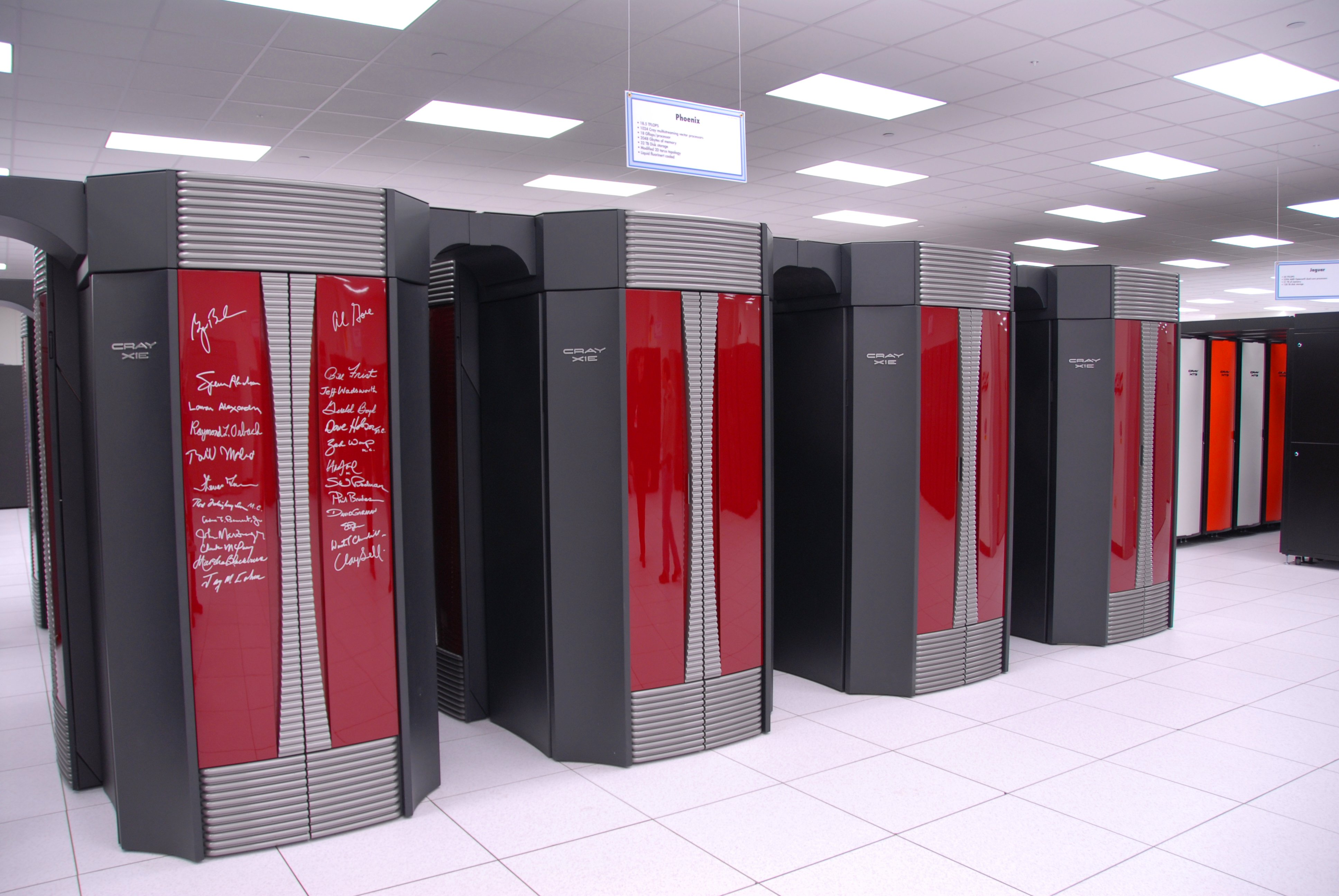
A Cray X1E supercomputer at Oak Ridge National Laboratory

The Cray X1 is a non-uniform memory access, vector processor supercomputer manufactured and sold by Cray Inc. since 2003. The X1 is often described as the unification of the Cray T90, Cray SV1, and Cray T3E architectures into a single machine. The X1 shares the multistreaming processors, vector caches, and CMOS design of the SV1, the highly scalable distributed memory design of the T3E, and the high memory bandwidth and liquid cooling of the T90.

The X1 uses a 1.2 ns (800 MHz) clock cycle, and eight-wide vector pipes in MSP mode, offering a peak speed of 12.8 gigaflops per processor. Air-cooled models are available with up to 64 processors. Liquid-cooled systems scale to a theoretical maximum of 4096 processors, comprising 1024 shared-memory nodes connected in a two-dimensional torus network, in 32 frames. Such a system would supply a peak speed of 50 teraflops. The largest unclassified X1 system was the 512-processor system at Oak Ridge National Laboratory, though this has since been upgraded to an X1E system.

The X1 can be programmed either with widely used message passing software like MPI and PVM, or with shared-memory languages like Unified Parallel C programming language or Co-array Fortran. The X1 runs an operating system called UNICOS/mp which shares more with the SGI IRIX operating system than it does with the UNICOS found on prior-generation Cray machines.

In 2005, Cray released the X1E upgrade, which uses dual-core processors, allowing two quad-processor nodes to fit on a node board. The processors are also upgraded to 1150 MHz. This upgrade almost triples the peak performance per board, but reduces the per-processor memory and interconnect bandwidth. X1 and X1E boards can be combined within the same system. At Cray, production transitioned from X1 to X1E machines, then ended in 2007.

The X1 is notable for its development being partly funded by United States Government's National Security Agency (under the code name SV2). The X1 was not a financially successful product and it seems doubtful that it or its successors would have been produced without this support.
