= Burton Smith =

American computer architect

Burton J. Smith
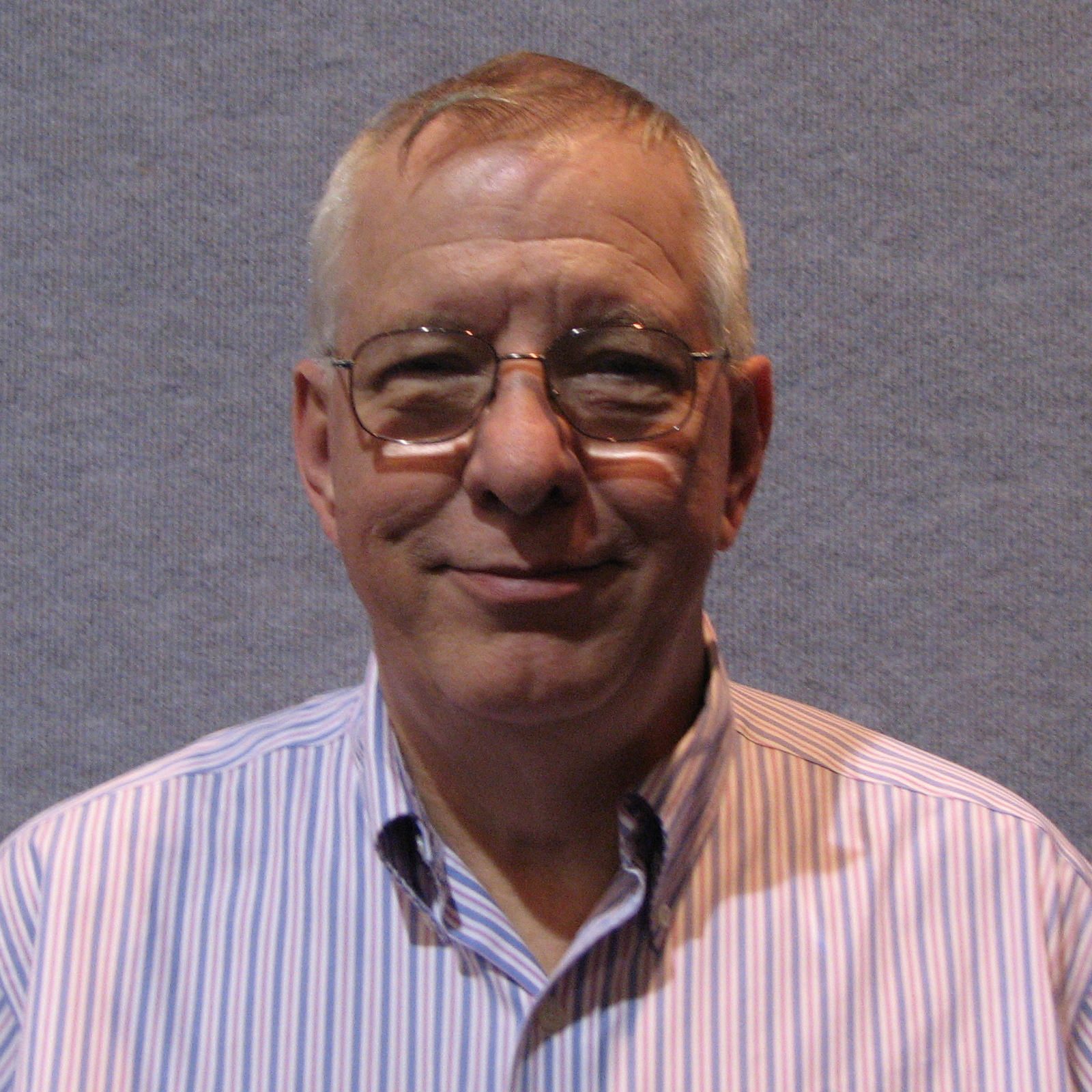
- Smith at Supercomputing in 2007
- Born: March 21, 1941; Chapel Hill, North Carolina, U.S.
- Died: April 2, 2018 (aged 77); Burien, Washington, U.S.
- Occupation: Technical Fellow at Microsoft
- Website: https://www.microsoft.com/en-us/research/people/burtons/

Burton J. Smith (March 21, 1941 – April 2, 2018) was an American computer architect. He was a Technical Fellow at Microsoft.

== Education ==
Smith graduated from the Cate School in Carpinteria, California in 1958, where he established himself as a gifted math and science student. Taking a special interest in chemistry, he placed third in a statewide competition as a senior. Smith then went on to Pomona College in Claremont, California to study physics. He transferred out of Pomona to the University of New Mexico following his freshman year, but was still unhappy with his education and subsequently dropped out of college entirely to join the Navy. Smith spent four years with the military before returning to the University of New Mexico, changing his studies from physics to Electrical engineering, graduating summa cum laude with a B.S.E.E. degree in 1967. Smith turned down acceptances from Berkeley and Stanford to attend the Massachusetts Institute of Technology to pursue his Doctorate, citing a financial aid package as the reasoning behind his decision. Part of this aid package was a work-study asking Smith to help build a database for the university's computer science department, one of Smith's first and formative experiences with computers. He earned an Sc.D. from MIT in 1972.

== Career ==
From 1970 to 1979, he taught at the Massachusetts Institute of Technology and the University of Colorado. Smith then spent six years at Denelcor Inc. in Colorado, serving as vice president of research and development. He was the primary architect of the Denelcor Heterogeneous Element Processor (HEP). From 1985 to 1988, Smith was a fellow of the Institute for Defense Analyses Supercomputing Research Center.

Smith co-founded Tera Computer Company and from 1988 until 2005 he served as its chief scientist and a member of the board of directors. He was also the company's chairman from 1988 until 1999. In 2000, Tera acquired the Cray Research business unit from Silicon Graphics, and renamed itself Cray Inc.

In December, 2005, Smith was hired by Microsoft as a Technical Fellow, working with various groups within the company to define and expand efforts in the areas of parallel and high-performance computing.

== Awards ==
Smith received the 1991 Eckert-Mauchly Award from the Institute of Electrical and Electronics Engineers (IEEE) and the Association for Computing Machinery. In 2003, he received the Seymour Cray Computer Science and Engineering Award from the IEEE Computer Society and was elected to the National Academy of Engineering. He received the IEEE Computer Society Charles Babbage Award and was elected fellow of the American Academy of Arts and Sciences in 2010. In 2018 he received the George Cotter Award for vision and leadership in the field of data analytics from the Association for High Speed Computing.

== Death ==
Smith died April 2, 2018, at Regional Hospital in Highline Medical Center in Burien, Washington. He is survived by two daughters, Julia and Katherine (Ray), his granddaughter Erin, and his brother David. Burton’s wife Dorothy had preceded him in death.
