= Tera Computer Company =

Defunct American supercomputer company

- Type: Public
- Traded as: Nasdaq: TERA
- Industry: Manufacturing
- Founded: 1987; 39 years ago
- Founders: James Rottsolk; Burton Smith
- Defunct: 2000; 26 years ago
- Fate: Renamed as Cray Inc.
- Headquarters: Seattle, Washington
- Products: Computer software and hardware

The Tera Computer Company was a manufacturer of high-performance computing software and hardware, founded in 1987 in Washington, D.C., and moved 1988 to Seattle, Washington, by James Rottsolk and Burton Smith. The company's first supercomputer product, named MTA, featured interleaved multi-threading, i.e. a barrel processor. It also had no data cache, relying instead on switching between threads for latency tolerance, and used a deeply pipelined memory system to handle many simultaneous requests, with address randomization to avoid memory hot spots.

The company was listed on NASDAQ under the ticker symbol "TERA".

In 1997, Tera Computer went to San Jose, California-based Cadence Design Systems Inc to develop microprocessors for its use in CMOS technology. Unisys manufactured Tera's gallium arsenide CPU.

Upon acquiring the Cray Research division of Silicon Graphics in 2000, the company was renamed to Cray Inc.

In 2019, Cray Inc. was acquired by Hewlett Packard Enterprise for $1.3 billion.

== See also ==
- Heterogeneous Element Processor
