= Cray J90 =

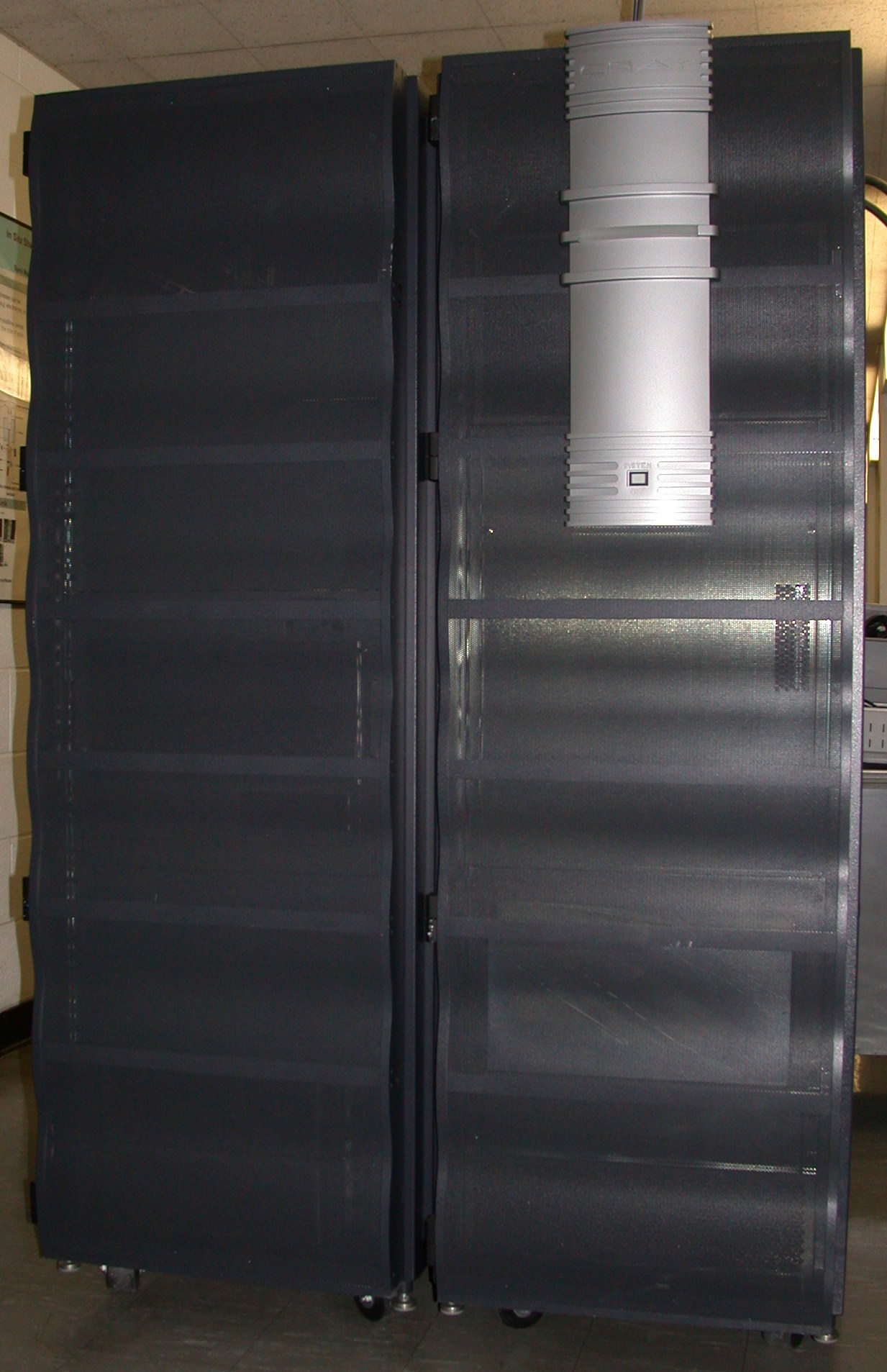
Cray J98

The Cray J90 series (code-named Jedi during development) was an air-cooled vector processor supercomputer first announced by Cray Research in 1994.

The J90 evolved from the Cray Y-MP EL minisupercomputer, and is compatible with Y-MP software, running the same UNICOS operating system. The later J90 models supported up to 32 CMOS processors with a 10 ns (100 MHz) clock. It supported up to 4 GB of main memory and up to 48 GB/s of memory bandwidth, giving it considerably less performance than the contemporary Cray T90, but making it a strong competitor to other technical computers in its price range.

All input/output in the early J90 models was handled by an IOS (Input/Output Subsystem) called IOS Model V. The IOS-V was based on the VME64 bus and SPARC I/O processors (IOPs) running the VxWorks RTOS. The IOS was programmed to emulate the IOS Model E, used in the larger Cray Y-MP systems, in order to minimize changes in the UNICOS operating system. By using standard VME boards, a wide variety of commodity peripherals could be used.

== Models ==
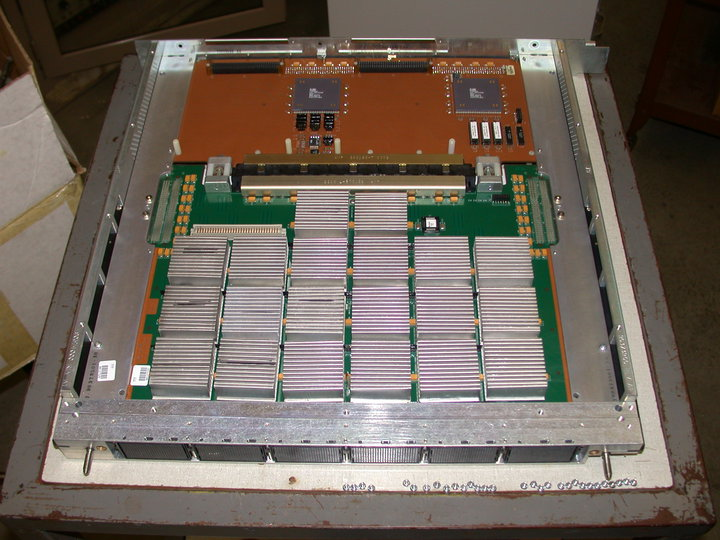
Cray J90 processor module with four scalar/vector processors

The J90 was available in three basic configurations, the J98 with up to eight processors, the J916 with up to 16 processors, and the J932 with up to 32 processors.

Each J90 processor was composed of two chips - one for the scalar portion of the processor, and the other for the vector portion. The scalar chip was also notable for including a small (128 word) data cache to enhance scalar performance. (Cray machines have always had instruction caching.)

In 1997 the J90se (Scalar Enhanced) series became available, which doubled the scalar speed of the processors to 200 MHz; the vector chip remained at 100 MHz. Support was also added for the GigaRing I/O system found on the Cray T3E and Cray SV1, replacing IOS-V. Later, SV1 processors could be installed in a J90 or J90se, further increasing performance within the same frame.
