= Heurikon =

The Heurikon Corporation was a microcomputer design and manufacturing company founded in Madison, Wisconsin in 1972. It provided microprocessors, hardware, and imaging equipment for medical and scientific applications, including notably during efforts to locate the wreck of the Titanic in 1985. Their products included custom microcomputer systems and plug-in microcomputer boards.

== Early history ==
Early customers included Oscar Mayer (Madison, WI), the Arrow Sign Corporation (Chicago, IL), Cuenique Billiards (Madison, WI) and Butler Manufacturing. Early products were based on the Zilog Z80 microprocessor, the Intel 8080 and the Motorola 68000 series of microprocessors.

== Use in locating the RMS Titanic ==
In 1985, Heurikon was involved in the joint effort by the United States and France to locate the sunken RMS Titanic. The equipment used for the project included a Heurikon HK68 along with three image processing boards, and processors and buffers made by a company called Imaging Technology. This hardware was used by the Woods Hole Oceanographic Institution to process the first images seen of the sunken ship.

== Growth and further uses ==
According to NASA Tech Briefs in 1989, Heurikon had been included in list of the top 500 fastest-growing privately owned U.S. companies compiled by Inc. Magazine six times. It was also providing processors for the U.S. National Archives in Washington, D.C. to record its collection.

In the 1990s, a major customer was TransCore (Norcross, GA) and the City Of New York for whom Heurikon designed and built the interface hardware for over 10,000 traffic lights in the five NYC boroughs.

In the mid-2000s, Heurikon VME bus boards were used by NASA in International Space Station EXPRESS rack suitcase simulators that payload developers around the world could use to pre-test their scientific payloads destined for the space station.

== Products ==
Heurikon's hardware included a line of 8-bit Multibus boards introduced in the early 1980s, and later microcomputers using the Motorola 68000 microprocessor in the 1980s.

The company offered several operating systems and development environments, including Unix, VxWorks, Hunter Ready VRTX and OS-9.

== Sale ==
In 1994, Heurikon (a privately held company) was sold to Computer Products Incorporated (CPI, Florida) and was renamed as the Artesyn Corporation. When the company was sold, there were four shareholders and annual sales had grown to over 20 million dollars.

Later, Artesyn was bought by Emerson Electric.
