= Cray XD1 =

Entry-level supercomputer

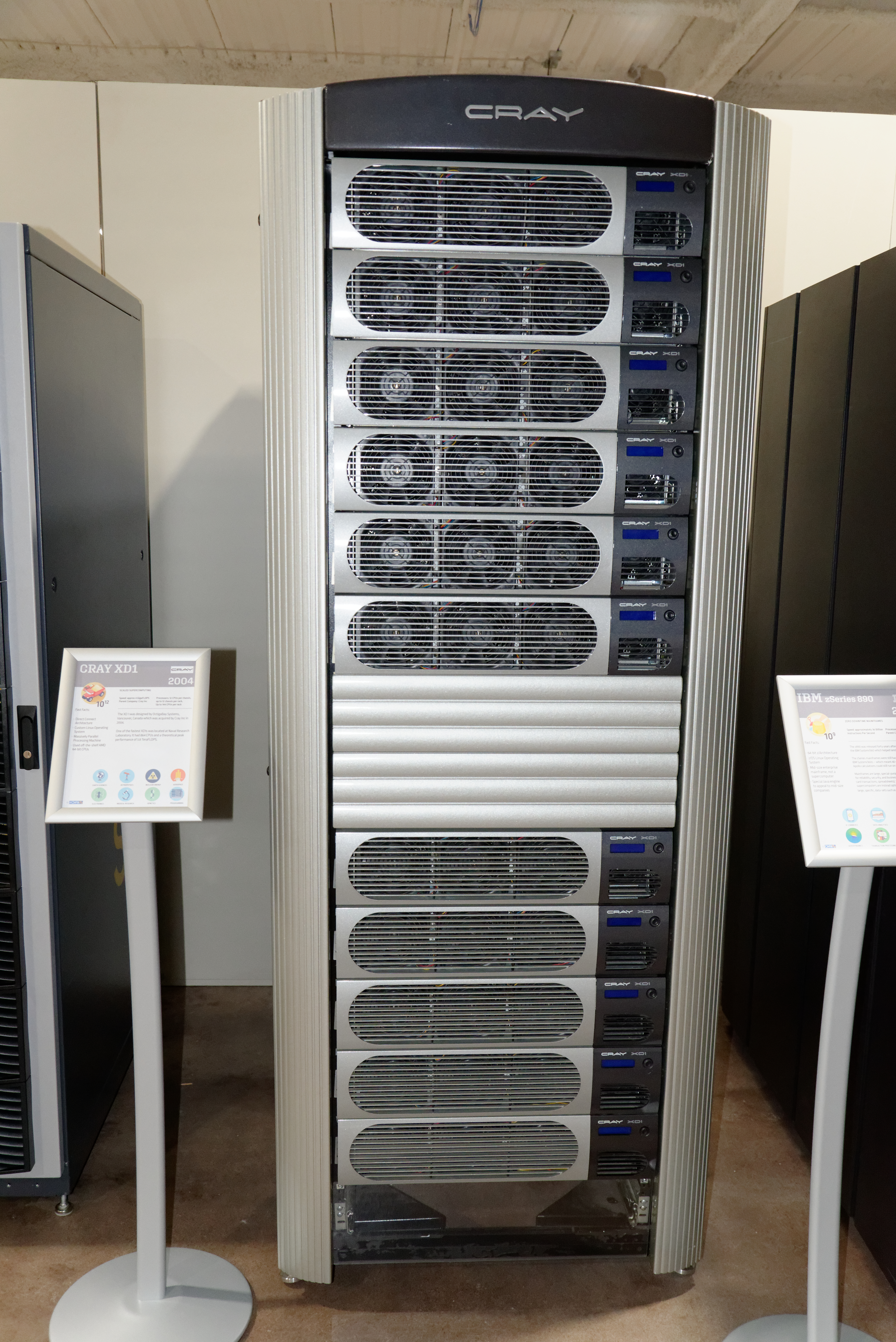

The Cray XD1 was an entry-level supercomputer range, made by Cray Inc.

The XD1 uses AMD Opteron 64-bit CPUs, and utilizes the Direct Connect Architecture over HyperTransport to remove the bottleneck at the PCI and contention at the memory. The MPI latency is ¼ that of Infiniband, and 1/30 that of Gigabit Ethernet.

The XD1 was originally designed by OctigaBay Systems Corp. of Vancouver, British Columbia, Canada as the OctigaBay 12K system. The company was acquired by Cray Inc. in February 2004.

Announced on 4 October 2004, the Cray XD1 range incorporate Xilinx Virtex-II Pro FPGAs for application acceleration. With 12 CPUs in a chassis, and up to 12 chassis installable in a rack, XD1 systems may hold several 144-CPU multiples in multirack configurations. The operating system used on the XD1 is a customized version of Linux, and the machine's load balancing / resource management system is an enhanced version of Sun Microsystems' Sun Grid Engine.
