= Cray T90 =

1995 supercomputer series

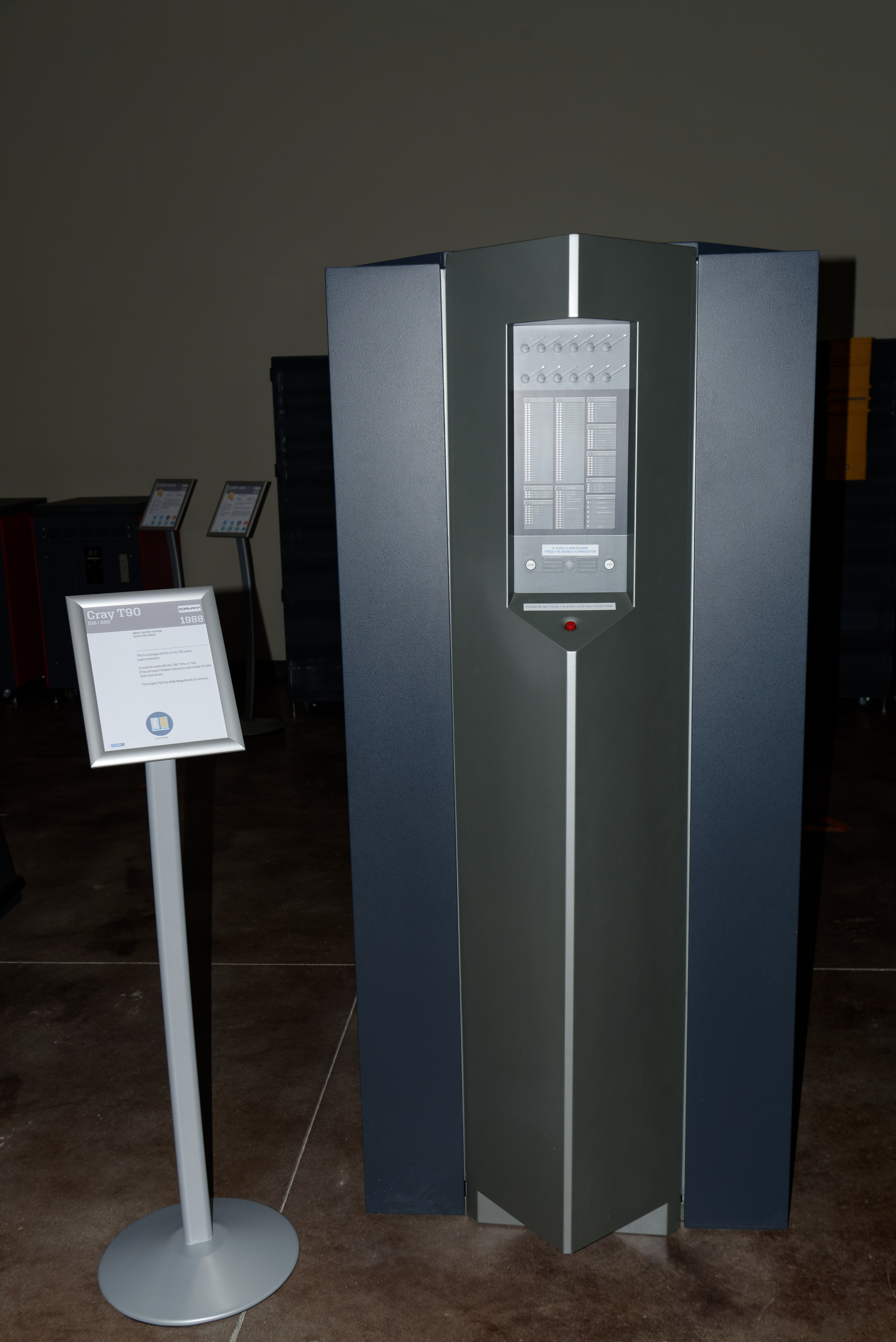
Storage subsystem for a Cray T90 at the Mimms Museum of Technology and Art.

The Cray T90 series (code-named Triton during development) was the last of a line of vector processing supercomputers manufactured by Cray Research, Inc, superseding the Cray C90 series. The first machines were shipped in 1995, and featured a 2.2 ns (450 MHz) clock cycle and two-wide vector pipes, for a peak speed of 1.8 gigaflops per processor; the high clock speed arises from the CPUs being built using emitter-coupled logic (ECL). By this point, the future lay with massively parallel processing systems, which Cray introduced with the T3D.

As with the Cray J90, each CPU contained a scalar data cache, in addition to the instruction buffering/caching which has always been in Cray architectures.

Configurations were available with between four and 32 processors, and with either IEEE 754 or traditional Cray floating-point arithmetic; the processors shared an SRAM main memory of up to eight gigabytes, with a bandwidth of three 64-bit words per cycle per CPU (giving a 32-CPU STREAM bandwidth of 360 gigabytes per second). The clock signal is distributed via a fiber-optic harness to the processors.

The T90 series was available in three variants, the T94 (one to four processors), T916 (eight to 16 processors) and T932 (16 to 32 processors).

It is widely considered as being slightly ahead of the state of the art at the time it was shipped; the systems were never particularly reliable. At launch, a 32-processor T932 cost $35 million.

Cray T90 systems were installed at, amongst other places, at least three US government sites, at NAVOCEANO in Mississippi (Bay St. Louis) USA, at NTT and NIED in Japan, at the Ford Motor Company and at General Motors, at NOAA's Geophysical Fluid Dynamics Laboratory, at Forschungszentrum Jülich in Germany, and at the Commissariat à l'Energie Atomique in France.

The system chassis weighs 10 short tons (9.1 t), contains 4 short tons (3.6 t) of fluorinert coolant, and is approximately the shape and size of a very large chest freezer, paneled in black and gold plastic.

Its successor, some years after the last T90s shipped, was the Cray X1.
