= Cray T3D =

1993 supercomputer model

The T3D (Torus, 3-Dimensional) was Cray Research's first attempt at a massively parallel supercomputer architecture. Launched in 1993, it also marked Cray's first use of another company's microprocessor. The T3D consisted of between 32 and 2048 Processing Elements (PEs), each comprising a 150 MHz DEC Alpha 21064 (EV4) microprocessor and either 16 or 64 MB of DRAM. PEs were grouped in pairs, or nodes, which incorporated a 6-way processor interconnect switch. These switches had a peak bandwidth of 300 MB/second in each direction and were connected to form a three-dimensional torus network topology.

The T3D was designed to be hosted by a Cray Y-MP Model E, M90 or C90-series "front-end" system and rely on it and its UNICOS operating system for all I/O and most system services. The T3D PEs ran a simple microkernel called UNICOS MAX.

Several different configurations of T3D were available. The SC (Single Cabinet) models shared a cabinet with a host Y-MP system and were available with either 128 or 256 PEs. The MC (Multi-Cabinet) models were housed in one or more liquid-cooled cabinet(s) separately from the host, while the MCA models were smaller (32 to 128 PEs) air-cooled multi-cabinet configurations. There was also a liquid-cooled MCN model which had an alternative interconnect wire mat allowing non-power-of-2 numbers of PEs.

The Cray T3D MC cabinet had an Apple Macintosh PowerBook laptop built into its front. Its only purpose was to display animated Cray Research and T3D logos on its color LCD screen.

The first T3D delivered was a prototype installed at the Pittsburgh Supercomputing Center in early September 1993. The supercomputer was formally introduced on 27 September 1993.

Cray T3D serial number 6001, originally Cray's internal development machine, was then installed at the Edinburgh Parallel Computing Centre. T3D serial number 6001 was ranked on TOP500 as Europe's fastest supercomputer in June 1996.

The T3D was superseded in 1995 by the faster and more sophisticated Cray T3E.

== Gallery ==
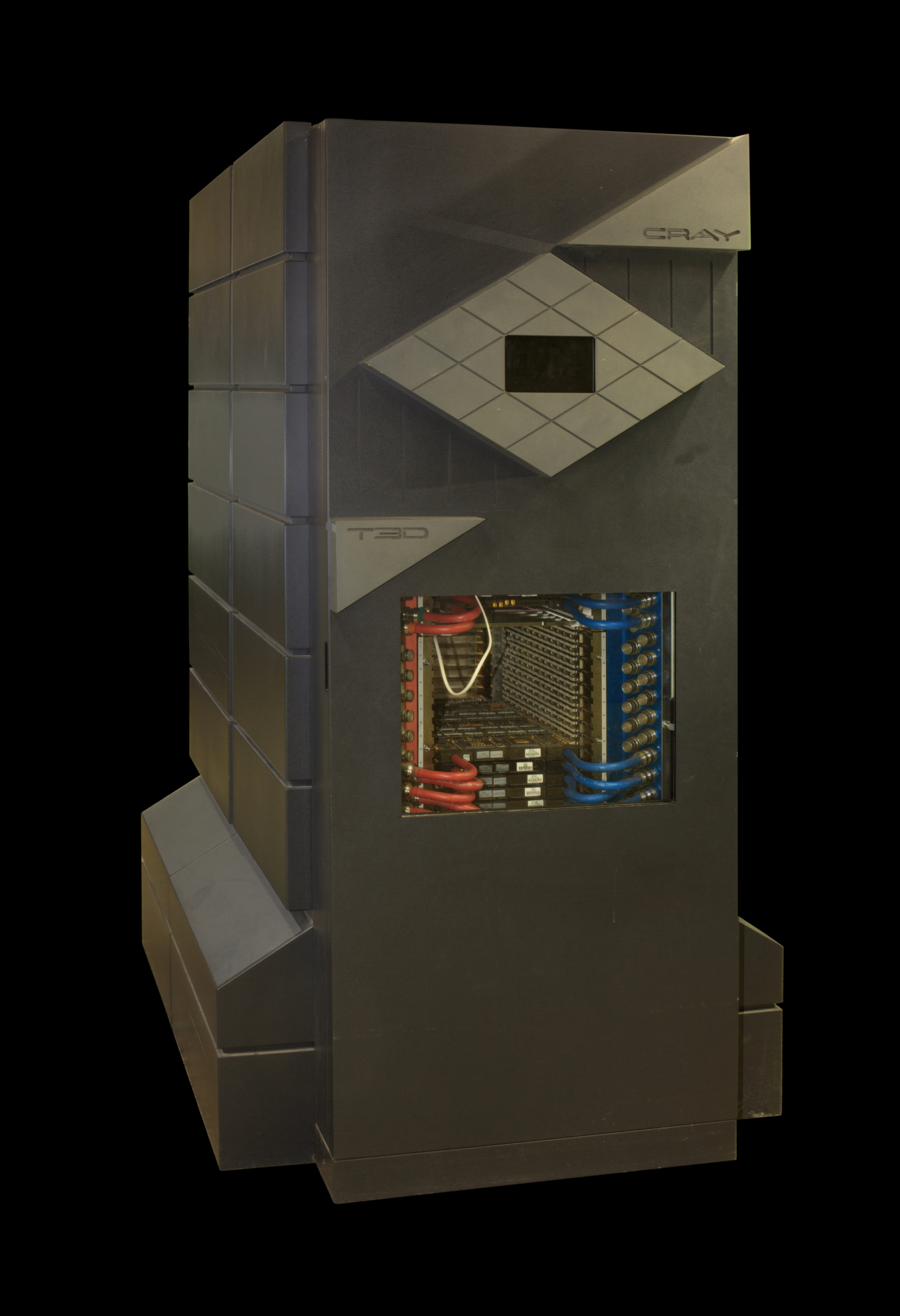
T3D MC 256 at the EPFL

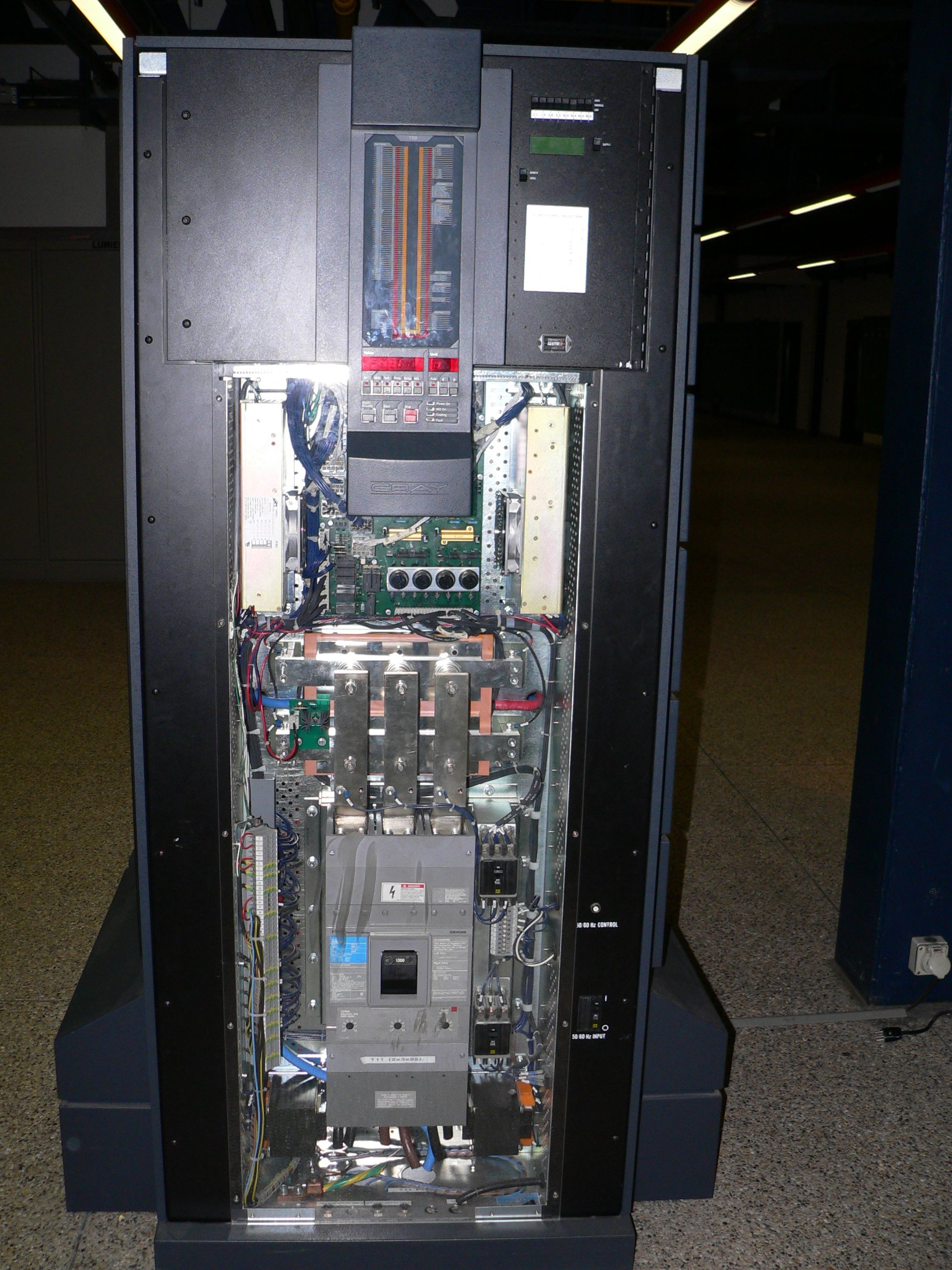
T3D MC 256 Computer

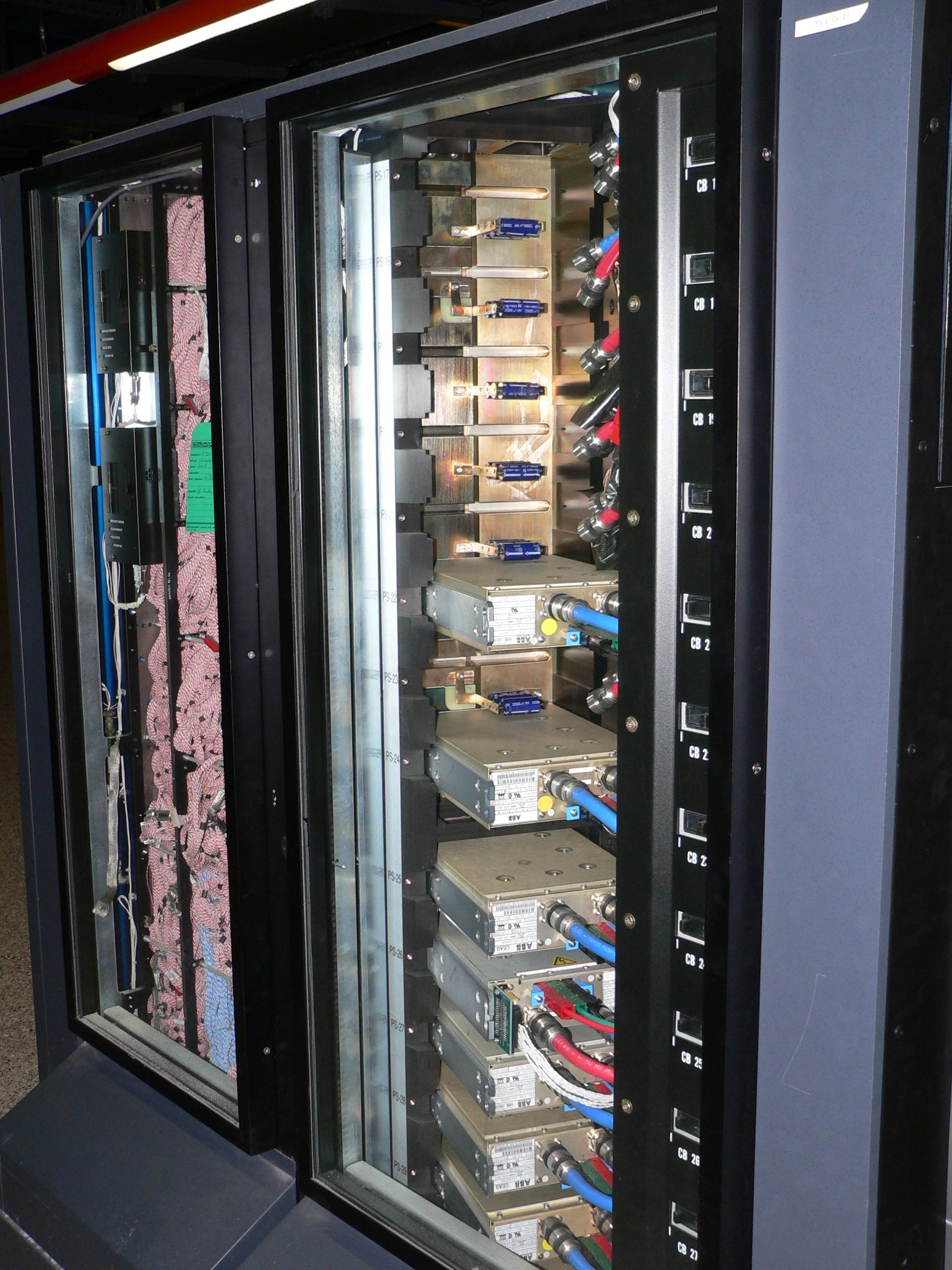

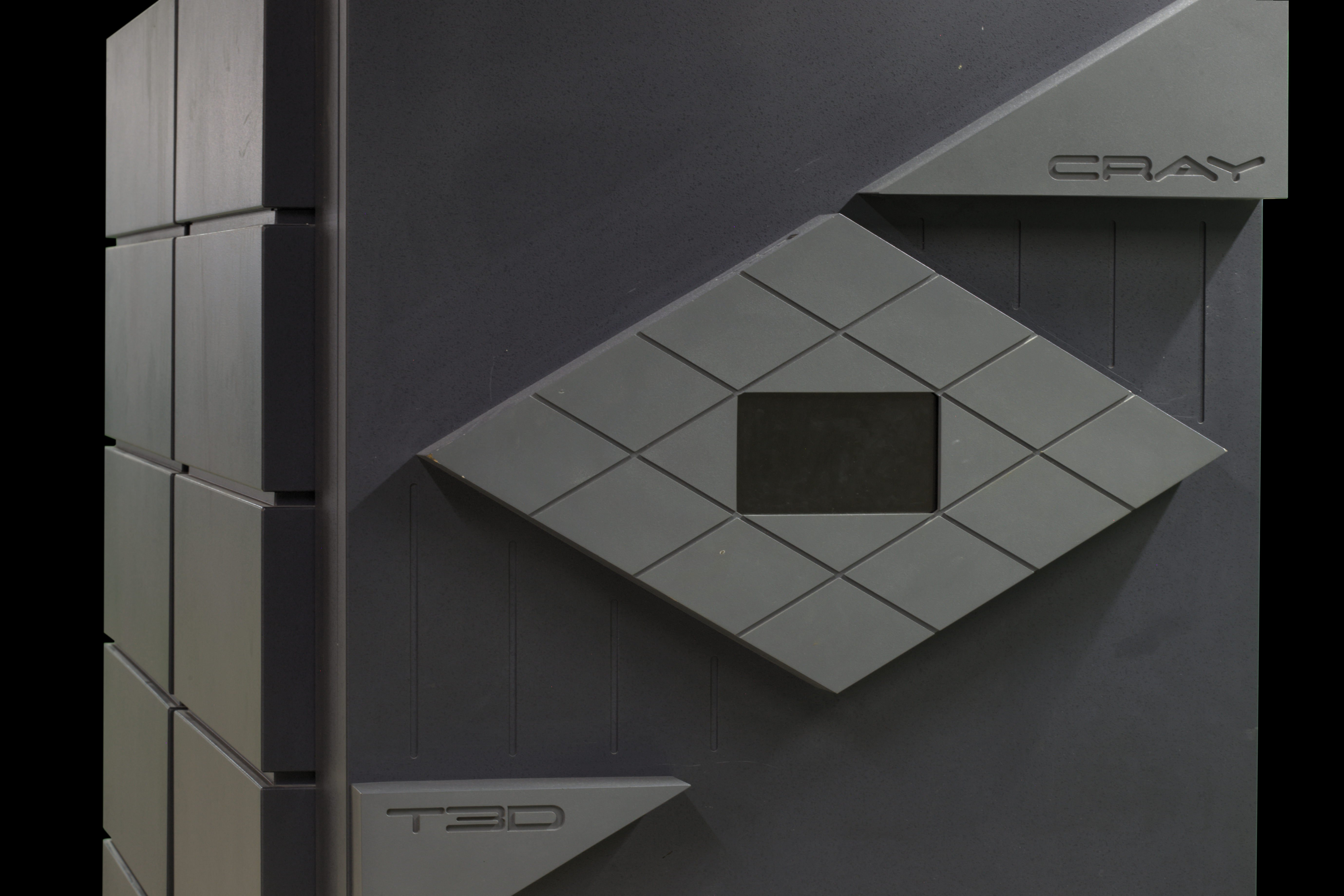

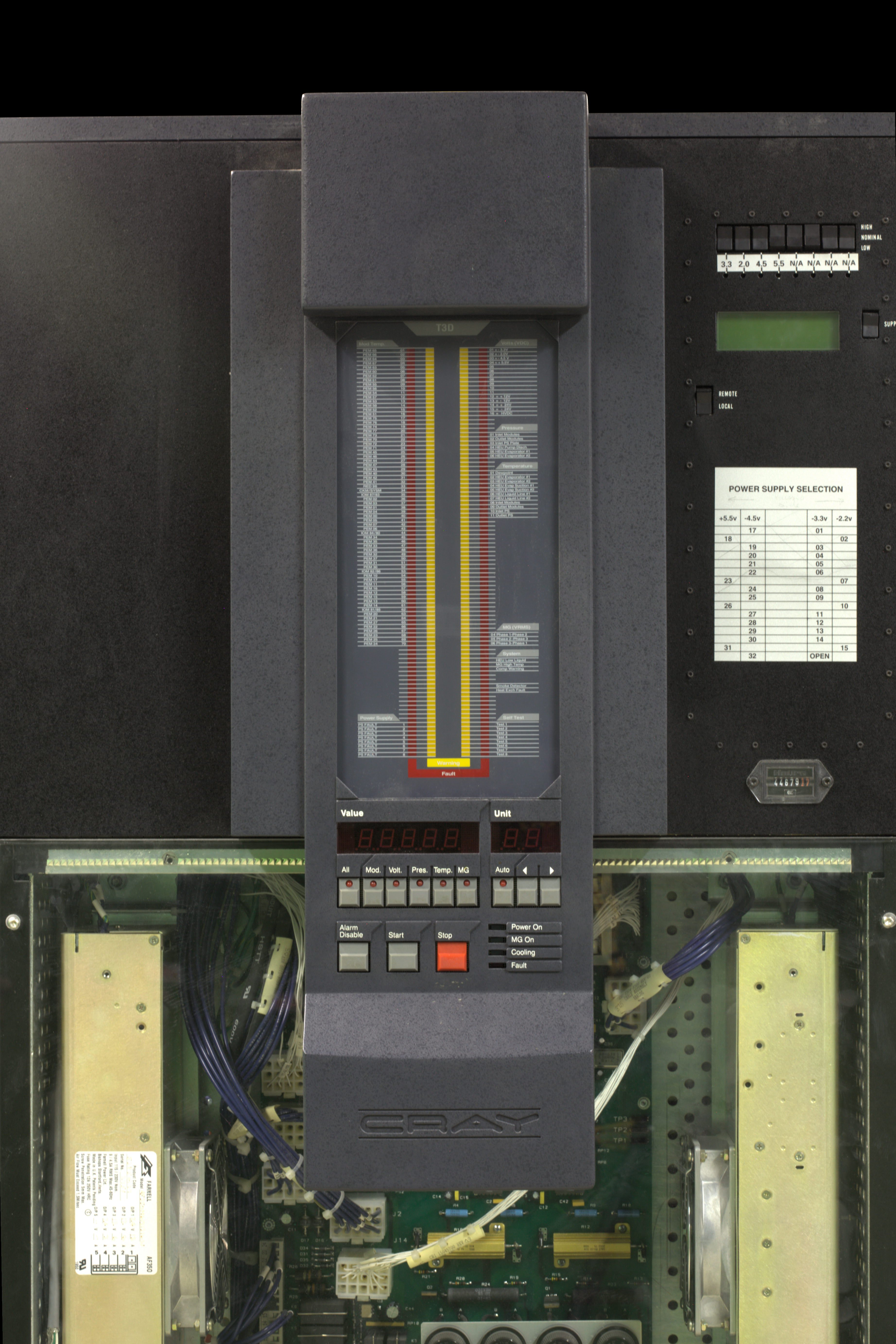
T3D MC 256 control panel

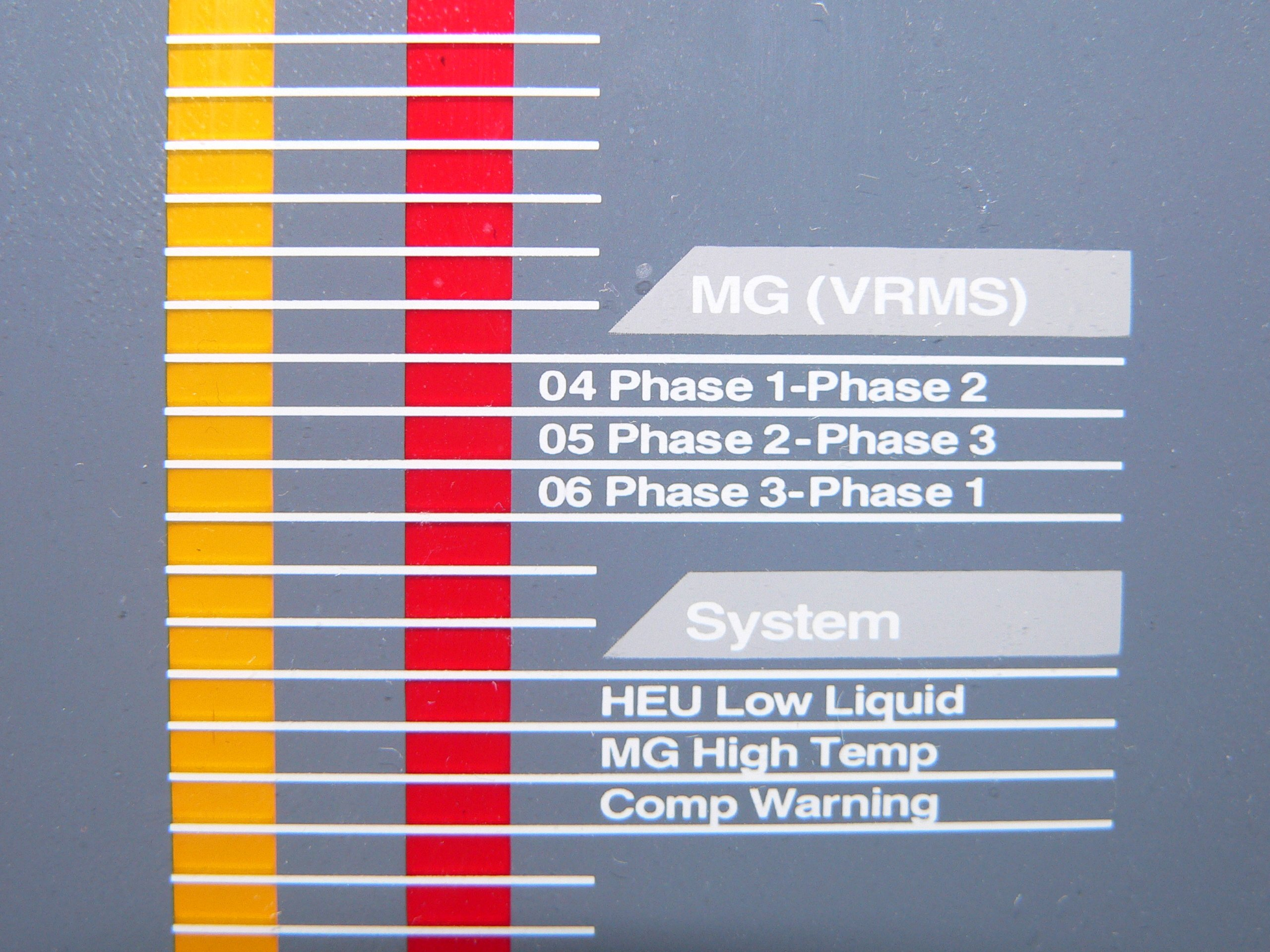
MC 256 control panel

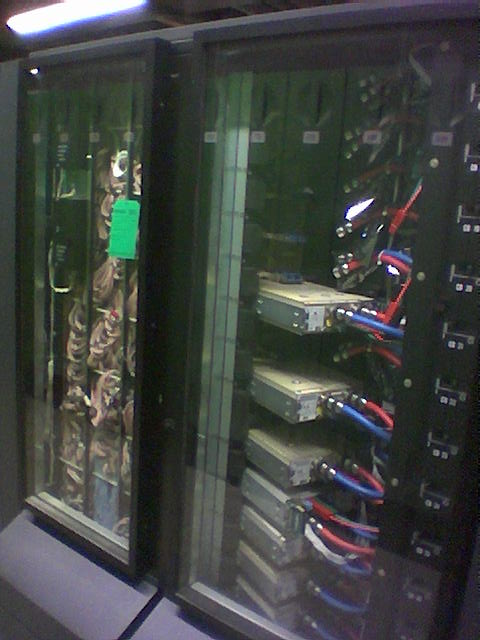
Inside of the T3D MC 256
