= Cray T3E =

1995 supercomputer

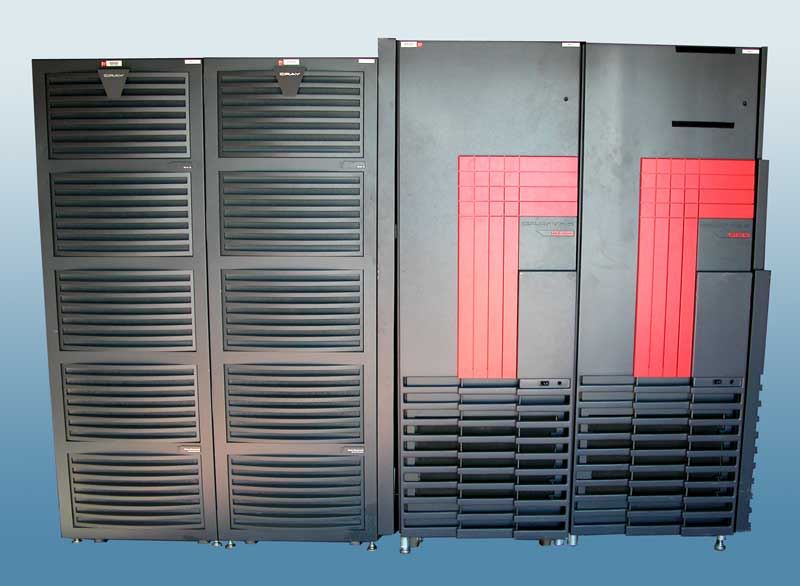
T3E-900 AC with two disk cabinets on left

The Cray T3E was Cray Research's second-generation massively parallel supercomputer architecture, launched in late November 1995. The first T3E was installed at the Pittsburgh Supercomputing Center in 1996. Like the previous Cray T3D, it was a fully distributed memory machine using a 3D torus topology interconnection network. The T3E initially used the DEC Alpha 21164 (EV5) microprocessor and was designed to scale from 8 to 2,176 Processing Elements (PEs). Each PE had between 64 MB and 2 GB of DRAM and a 6-way interconnect router with a payload bandwidth of 480 MB/s in each direction. Unlike many other MPP systems, including the T3D, the T3E was fully self-hosted and ran the UNICOS/mk distributed operating system with a GigaRing I/O subsystem integrated into the torus for network, disk and tape I/O.

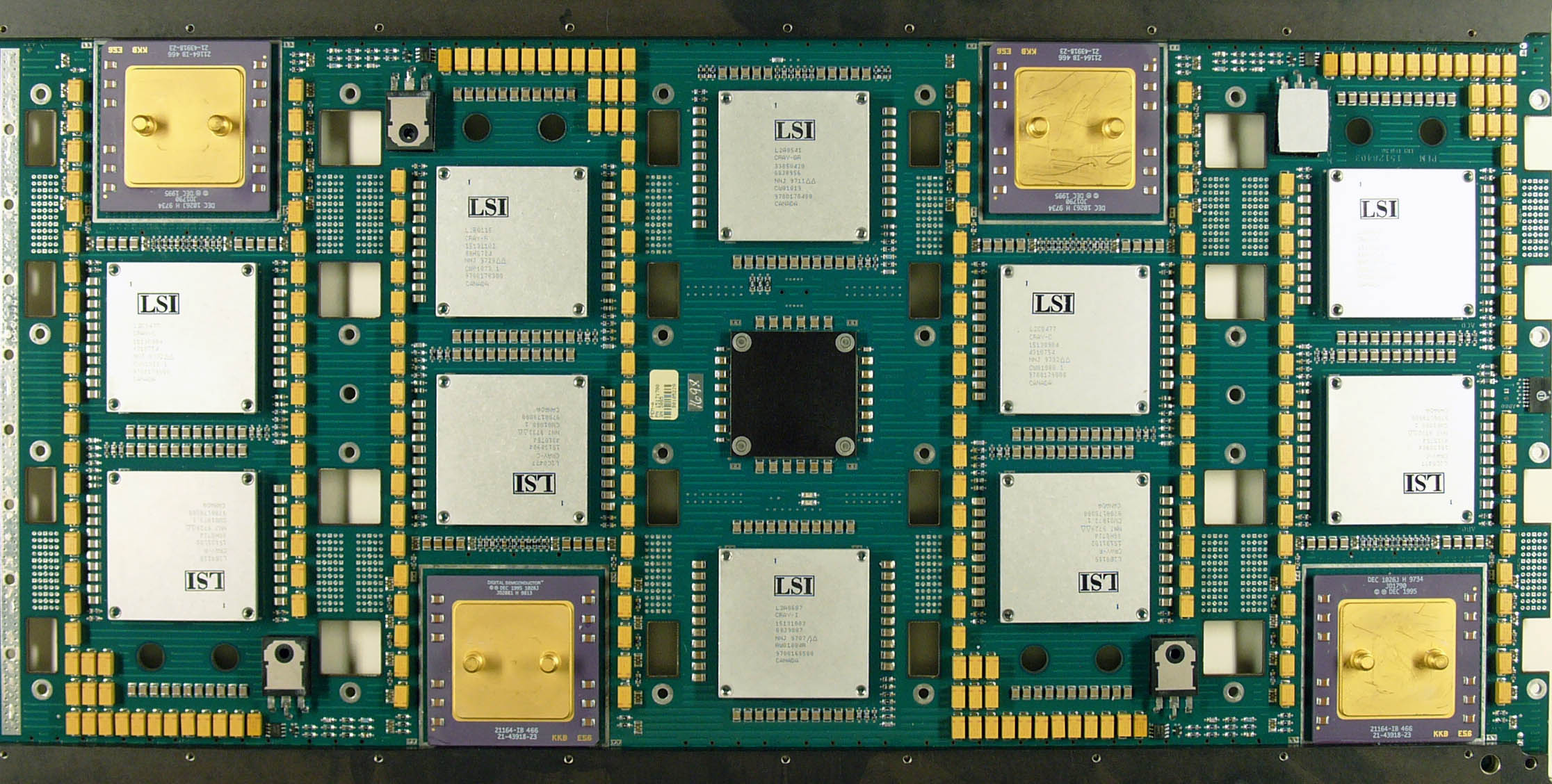
T3E-600 processor board

The original T3E (retrospectively known as the T3E-600) had a 300 MHz processor clock. Later variants, using the faster 21164A (EV56) processor, comprised the T3E-900 (450 MHz), T3E-1200 (600 MHz), T3E-1200E (with improved memory and interconnect performance) and T3E-1350 (675 MHz). The T3E was available in both air-cooled (AC) and liquid-cooled (LC) configurations. AC systems were available with 16 to 128 user PEs, LC systems with 64 to 2048 user PEs.

A 1480-processor T3E-1200 was the first supercomputer to achieve a performance of more than 1 teraflops running a computational science application, in 1998.

After Cray Research was acquired by Silicon Graphics in February 1996, development of new Alpha-based systems was stopped. While providing the -900, -1200 and -1200E upgrades to the T3E, in the long term Silicon Graphics intended Cray T3E users to migrate to the Origin 3000, a MIPS-based distributed shared memory computer, introduced in 2000. However, the T3E continued in production after SGI sold the Cray business the same year.

== See also ==
- History of supercomputing
