= List of fastest computers =

This is a historical list of fastest computers and includes computers and supercomputers which were considered the fastest in the world at the time they were built.

Year	Country of site	Site	Vendor / builder	Computer	Performance^{[a]}		Ref.
1938	Germany	Personal research and development Berlin, Germany	Konrad Zuse	Z1	1	IPS	
1940	Germany	Personal research and development Berlin, Germany	Konrad Zuse	Z2	1.25	IPS	
1941	Germany	Personal research and development Berlin, Germany	Konrad Zuse	Z3	20	IPS	
1944	United Kingdom	Bletchley Park	Tommy Flowers and his team, Post Office Research Station	Colossus	5	kIPS	
1945	United States	University of Pennsylvania	Moore School of Electrical Engineering	ENIAC	5	kIPS	
1951	United States	Massachusetts Institute of Technology	MIT Servomechanisms Laboratory	Whirlwind I	20	kIPS	
1958	United States	McGuire Air Force Base	IBM	AN/FSQ-7	75	kIPS	
1960	United States	Los Alamos Scientific Laboratory	IBM	7090	229	kIPS	
1960	United States	Lawrence Livermore National Laboratory	Remington Rand's UNIVAC	LARC	250	kIPS	
1961	United States	Los Alamos Scientific Laboratory	IBM	7030 Stretch	1.2	MIPS	
1962	United Kingdom	University of Manchester	University of Manchester, Ferranti International, and Plessey Co.	Atlas	1	MFLOPS	
1964	United States	Lawrence Livermore and Los Alamos	CDC	6600	3	MFLOPS	
1969	United States	Lawrence Livermore National Laboratory	CDC	7600	36	MFLOPS	
1974	United States	Lawrence Livermore National Laboratory	CDC	STAR-100	100	MFLOPS	
1976	United States	Los Alamos Scientific Laboratory	Cray	Cray-1	160	MFLOPS	
1980	United Kingdom	Meteorological Office, Bracknell	CDC	Cyber 205	400	MFLOPS	
1983	United States	National Security Agency	Cray	X-MP/4	713	MFLOPS*	
1985	United States	Lawrence Livermore National Laboratory	Cray	Cray-2	1.41	GFLOPS*	
1988	United States	NASA Ames Research Center	Cray	Y-MP/832	2.14	GFLOPS*	
1990	Japan	Fuji Heavy Industries	Fujitsu	VP2600/10	4	GFLOPS*	
1992	Canada	Atmospheric Environment Service	NEC	SX-3/44	20	GFLOPS*	
1993	United States	Los Alamos National Laboratory	Thinking Machines	CM-5/1024	59.7	GFLOPS*	
1993	Japan	National Aerospace Laboratory of Japan	Fujitsu	Numerical Wind Tunnel	124.2	GFLOPS*	
1994	United States	Sandia National Laboratories	Intel	Paragon XP/S 140	143.4	GFLOPS*	
1994	Japan	National Aerospace Laboratory of Japan	Fujitsu	Numerical Wind Tunnel	170	GFLOPS*	
1996	Japan	University of Tokyo	Hitachi	SR2201	232.4	GFLOPS*	
1996	Japan	University of Tsukuba	Hitachi	CP-PACS	368.2	GFLOPS*	
1997	United States	Sandia National Laboratories	Intel	ASCI Red	1.06	TFLOPS*	
2000	United States	Lawrence Livermore National Laboratory	IBM	ASCI White	4.93	TFLOPS*	
2001	United States	Lawrence Livermore National Laboratory	IBM	ASCI White	7.2	TFLOPS*	
2002	Japan	JAMSTEC Earth Simulator Center	NEC	Earth Simulator	35.86	TFLOPS*	
2004	United States	Lawrence Livermore National Laboratory	IBM	Blue Gene/L	70.72	TFLOPS*	
2005	United States	Lawrence Livermore National Laboratory	IBM	Blue Gene/L	136.8	TFLOPS*	
2005	United States	Lawrence Livermore National Laboratory	IBM	Blue Gene/L	280.6	TFLOPS*	
2007	United States	Lawrence Livermore National Laboratory	IBM	Blue Gene/L	478.2	TFLOPS*	
2008	United States	Los Alamos National Laboratory	IBM	Roadrunner	1.02	PFLOPS*	
2008	United States	Los Alamos National Laboratory	IBM	Roadrunner	1.1	PFLOPS*	
2009	United States	Oak Ridge National Laboratory	Cray	Jaguar	1.75	PFLOPS*	
2010	China	National Supercomputing Center in Tianjin	National University of Defense Technology	Tianhe-1A	2.57	PFLOPS*	
2011	Japan	RIKEN Advanced Institute for Computational Science	Fujitsu	K computer	10.51	PFLOPS*	
2012	United States	Lawrence Livermore National Laboratory	IBM	Sequoia (Blue Gene/Q)	16.32	PFLOPS*	
2012	United States	Oak Ridge National Laboratory	Cray	Titan	17.59	PFLOPS*	
2013	China	National Supercomputing Center in Guangzhou	National University of Defense Technology	Tianhe-2	33.86	PFLOPS*	
2016	China	National Supercomputing Center in Wuxi	NRCPC	Sunway TaihuLight	93.01	PFLOPS*	
2018	United States	Oak Ridge National Laboratory	IBM	Summit	122.3	PFLOPS*	
2019	United States	Oak Ridge National Laboratory	IBM	Summit	148.6	PFLOPS*	
2020	Japan	RIKEN Center for Computational Science	Fujitsu	Fugaku	415.53	PFLOPS*	
2020	Japan	RIKEN Center for Computational Science	Fujitsu	Fugaku	442.01	PFLOPS*	
2022	United States	Oak Ridge National Laboratory	HPE Cray	Frontier	1.102	EFLOPS*	
2023	United States	Oak Ridge National Laboratory	HPE Cray	Frontier	1.194	EFLOPS*	
2024	United States	Oak Ridge National Laboratory	HPE Cray	Frontier	1.206	EFLOPS*	
2024	United States	Lawrence Livermore National Laboratory	HPE Cray	El Capitan	1.742	EFLOPS*	
2025	United States	Lawrence Livermore National Laboratory	HPE Cray	El Capitan	1.809	EFLOPS*	
2026	China	National Supercomputing Center in Shenzhen	Shenzhen Cloud Computing Center	LineShine	2.198	EFLOPS*	

a. Performance figures for computers prior to 1983 represent nominal operation rates or peak instruction throughput.
An asterisk (*) denotes R_{max} – the highest sustained performance measured using the LINPACK benchmarks suite.

== See also ==
- History of supercomputing
- List of the top supercomputers in the United States
- Timeline of instructions per second (IPS)
- TOP500 § Systems ranked No. 1 (FLOPS)
