= Digital Computer Association =

Organization established in November 1952, and disbanded in 1994

The Digital Computer Association (DCA) was established in November 1952 in Santa Monica, California. It was disbanded in 1994.

The organization held monthly 2–3 hour technical dinner meetings at local restaurants attended by early computer engineers and computer programmers. The founder was R. Blair Smith, a local IBM salesman. He had two reasons for starting the organization: to recruit the help of all 18 IBM 701 customers in combating copyright infringement, causing salaries to increase; and to provide a forum for exchanging software programs to eliminate duplication of effort.

The DCA was loosely organized, met monthly, held an annual party and put out a newsletter. The group was run by a volunteer committee who selected the president (called the Fish). According to the rules of the organization, the newly elected president had to serve or move out of town.

At the monthly meeting, resumes and ideas were exchanged before the meal, and after the dinner an invited speaker addressed the group. Computer programming was still a relatively new field and people came to the meetings to keep abreast of new developments, techniques and products, as well as to check out local job opportunities and to socialize.

By 1966, the DCA was becoming less important and was terminated, as national organizations, such as the Association for Computing Machinery (ACM) replaced it as the place to go for professional contacts and information. Shortly thereafter some old DCA members, missing the casual nature and camaraderie of the meetings, decided to resurrect DCA as a larger yearly event. This reincarnation was held in a hotel ballroom and dispensed with serious discussions.

The annual meetings started with a cocktail hour followed by a dinner with wine. When the dessert dishes were cleared and the wait staff had left the room, short skits were presented, starting with the "Welcome to the Virgins", which brought first-time attendees up to the podium to be adorned with the customary paper toilet seat cover. This was all punctuated by corks tossed toward the podium and from table to table. People saved their wine corks all year to cut into non-lethal sizes and throw at each other. It was quite unprofessional.

In 1972, a contest was held to create a DCA logo. The winner submitted a graphic of a magnetic tape reel with a martini glass in the center. Overlaid were the concentric letters D, C, A, and around the top circumference of the reel was the phrase "Since 1952" and around the bottom "FASTER THAN A SPEEDING CORK".

The DCA continued in this fashion through 1993. In 1994, it was disbanded. This was influenced by the occurrence of the 1994 Northridge earthquake and the subsequent confusion and movement of several people away from the Los Angeles area.

== Sources ==
- Akera, Atsushi (2008). Calculating a Natural World: Scientists, Engineers, and Computers During the Rise of U.S. Cold War Research. MIT Press. p. 253. ISBN 978-0262512039.
- Beeler, Jeffrey (20 April 1987). "DCA Members Just Want To Have Fun". Computerworld. IDG Enterprise: 21.
- Grosch, Herb (18 June 1976). "Faster Than A Speeding Cork". Computerworld. 9 (25). IDG Enterprise: 17. ISSN 0010-4841.
- Gruenberger, Fred J. (1980). "A Short History of Digital Computing in Southern California" (PDF). IEEE Annals of the History of Computing. 2 (3: July–September). IEEE Computer Society: 246–250. doi:10.1109/MAHC.1980.10031.
- Kent, Allen; Williams, James G., eds. (1990). "Encyclopedia of Computer Science and Technology: Volume 22 - Supplement 7: Artificial Intelligence to Vector SPate Model in Information Retrieval". Encyclopedia of Computer Science and Technology. Vol. 22. CRC Press. p. 303. ISBN 978-0824722722.
- Patrick, Robert L. (2010). "Remembering the Digital Computer Association". IEEE Annals of the History of Computing. 32 (2: April–June). IEEE Computer Society: 83–86. doi:10.1109/MAHC.2010.29.
- Smith, R. Blair (1980). "An Interview With R. Blair Smith" (PDF). The Center for the History of Information Processing (Interview). Interviewed by Robina Mapstone. Charles Babbage Institute, University of Minnesota, Minneapolis. Archived from the original (PDF) on 2013-03-09.
- Ware, Willis H. (2008). RAND and the Information Evolution: A History in Essays and Vignettes. Rand Corporation. p. 193. ISBN 978-0833045133.
- Zuse, Konrad (1980). "Installation of the German Computer Z4 in Zurich in 1950". IEEE Annals of the History of Computing. 2 (3: July–September). IEEE Computer Society: 239–241. doi:10.1109/MAHC.1980.10028. ISSN 0164-1239. S2CID 7525572.
