= Seymour Cray =

American supercomputer architect (1925–1996)

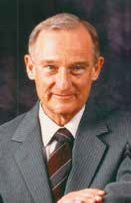
- Born: Seymour Roger Cray; September 28, 1925; Chippewa Falls, Wisconsin, US
- Died: October 5, 1996 (aged 71); Colorado Springs, Colorado, US
- Education: University of Minnesota
- Known for: Supercomputers
- Spouse(s): Verene Voll (1947–1978; divorced); Geri M. Harrand
- Children: 3
- Relatives: Andrew Cray (grandson)
- Scientific career
- Fields: Applied mathematics, computer science, and electrical engineering
- Workplaces: Engineering Research Associates; Control Data Corporation; Cray Research; Cray Computer Corporation; SRC Computers

Seymour Roger Cray (September 28, 1925 – October 5, 1996) was an American electrical engineer, computer scientist, mathematician, and supercomputer architect who designed a series of computers that were the fastest in the world for decades, and founded Cray Research, which built many of these machines. Called "the father of supercomputing", Cray has been credited with creating the supercomputer industry. Joel S. Birnbaum, then chief technology officer of Hewlett-Packard, said of him: "It seems impossible to exaggerate the effect he had on the industry; many of the things that high performance computers now do routinely were at the farthest edge of credibility when Seymour envisioned them." Larry Smarr, then director of the National Center for Supercomputing Applications at the University of Illinois said that Cray is "the Thomas Edison of the supercomputing industry."

== Early life ==
Cray was born in 1925 in Chippewa Falls, Wisconsin, to Seymour R. and Lillian Cray. His father was a civil engineer who fostered Cray's interest in science and engineering. As early as the age of ten he was able to build a device out of Erector Set components that converted punched paper tape into Morse code signals. The basement of the family home was given over to the young Cray as a "laboratory".

Cray graduated from Chippewa Falls High School in 1943 before being drafted for World War II as a radio operator. He saw action in Europe, and then moved to the Pacific theatre where he worked on breaking Japanese naval codes. On his return to the United States he earned a B.Sc. in electrical engineering at the University of Minnesota, graduating in 1949, followed by a M.Sc. in applied mathematics in 1951.

== Career ==
=== Engineering Research Associates ===
In 1950, Cray joined Engineering Research Associates (ERA) in Saint Paul, Minnesota. ERA had formed out of a former United States Navy laboratory that had built codebreaking machines, a tradition ERA carried on when such work was available. ERA was introduced to computer technology during one such effort, but in other times had worked on a wide variety of basic engineering as well.

Cray quickly came to be regarded as an expert on digital computer technology, especially following his design work on the ERA 1103, the first commercially successful scientific computer. He remained at ERA when it was bought by Remington Rand and then Sperry Corporation in the early 1950s. At the newly formed Sperry Rand, ERA became the scientific computing arm of their UNIVAC division.

=== Control Data Corporation ===
Cray, along with William Norris, later became dissatisfied with ERA, then spun off as Sperry Rand. In 1957, they founded a new company, Control Data Corporation.

By 1960 he had completed the design of the CDC 1604, an improved low-cost ERA 1103 that had impressive performance for its price. Even as the CDC 1604 was starting to ship to customers in 1960, Cray had already moved on to designing other computers. He first worked on the design of an upgraded version (the CDC 3000 series), but company management wanted these machines targeted toward "business and commercial" data processing for average customers. Cray did not enjoy working on such "mundane" machines, constrained to design for low-cost construction, so CDC could sell many of them. His desire was to "produce the largest [fastest] computer in the world". So after some basic design work on the CDC 3000 series, he turned that over to others and went on to work on the CDC 6600. Nonetheless, several special features of the 6600 first started to appear in the 3000 series.

Although in terms of hardware the 6600 was not on the leading edge, Cray invested considerable effort into the design of the machine in an attempt to enable it to run as fast as possible. Unlike most high-end projects, Cray realized that there was considerably more to performance than simple processor speed, that I/O bandwidth had to be maximized as well in order to avoid "starving" the processor of data to crunch. He later noted, "Anyone can build a fast CPU. The trick is to build a fast system."

The 6600 was the first commercial supercomputer, outperforming everything then available by a wide margin. While expensive, for those that needed the fastest computer available there was nothing else on the market that could compete. When IBM attempted to create machines with similar performance, they stumbled (IBM 7030 Stretch). In the 6600, Cray had solved the critical design problem of "imprecise interrupts", which was largely responsible for IBM's failure. He did this by replacing I/O interrupts with a polled request issued by one of ten so-called peripheral processors, which were built-in mini-computers that did all transfers in and out of the 6600's central memory. The following CDC 7600 even improved the speed advantage by a factor of five.

In 1963, in a Business Week article announcing the CDC 6600, Seymour Cray clearly expressed an idea that is often misattributed to Herb Grosch as so-called Grosch's law:

Computers should obey a square law — when the price doubles, you should get at least four times as much speed.

— Seymour Cray, "Computers get faster than ever", Business Week (31 August 1963): p. 28.

==== CDC's Chippewa Falls laboratory ====
During this period Cray had become increasingly annoyed at what he saw as interference from CDC management. Cray always demanded an absolutely quiet work environment with a minimum of management overhead, but as the company grew he found himself constantly interrupted by middle managers who – according to Cray – did little but gawk and use him as a sales tool by introducing him to prospective customers.

Cray decided that in order to continue development he would have to move from St. Paul, far enough that it would be too long a drive for a "quick visit" and long-distance telephone charges would be just enough to deter most calls, yet close enough that real visits or board meetings could be attended without too much difficulty. After some debate, Norris backed him and set up a new laboratory on land Cray owned in his hometown of Chippewa Falls. Part of the reason for the move may also have to do with Cray's worries about an impending nuclear war, which he felt made the Twin Cities a serious safety concern. His house, built a few hundred yards from the new CDC laboratory, included a huge bomb shelter.

The new Chippewa Lab was set up during the middle of the 6600 project, although it does not seem to have delayed the project. After the 6600 shipped, the successor CDC 7600 system was the next product to be developed in Chippewa Falls, offering peak computational speeds of ten times the 6600. The failed follow-on to the 7600, the CDC 8600, was the project that finally ended his run of successes at CDC in 1972.

Although the 6600 and 7600 had been huge successes in the end, both projects had almost bankrupted the company while they were being designed. The 8600 was running into similar difficulties and Cray eventually decided that the only solution was to start over fresh. This time Norris was not willing to take the risk, and another project within the company, the CDC STAR-100, seemed to be progressing more smoothly. Norris said he was willing to keep the project alive at a low level until the STAR was delivered, at which point full funding could be put into the 8600. Cray was unwilling to work under these conditions and left the company.

=== Cray Research ===
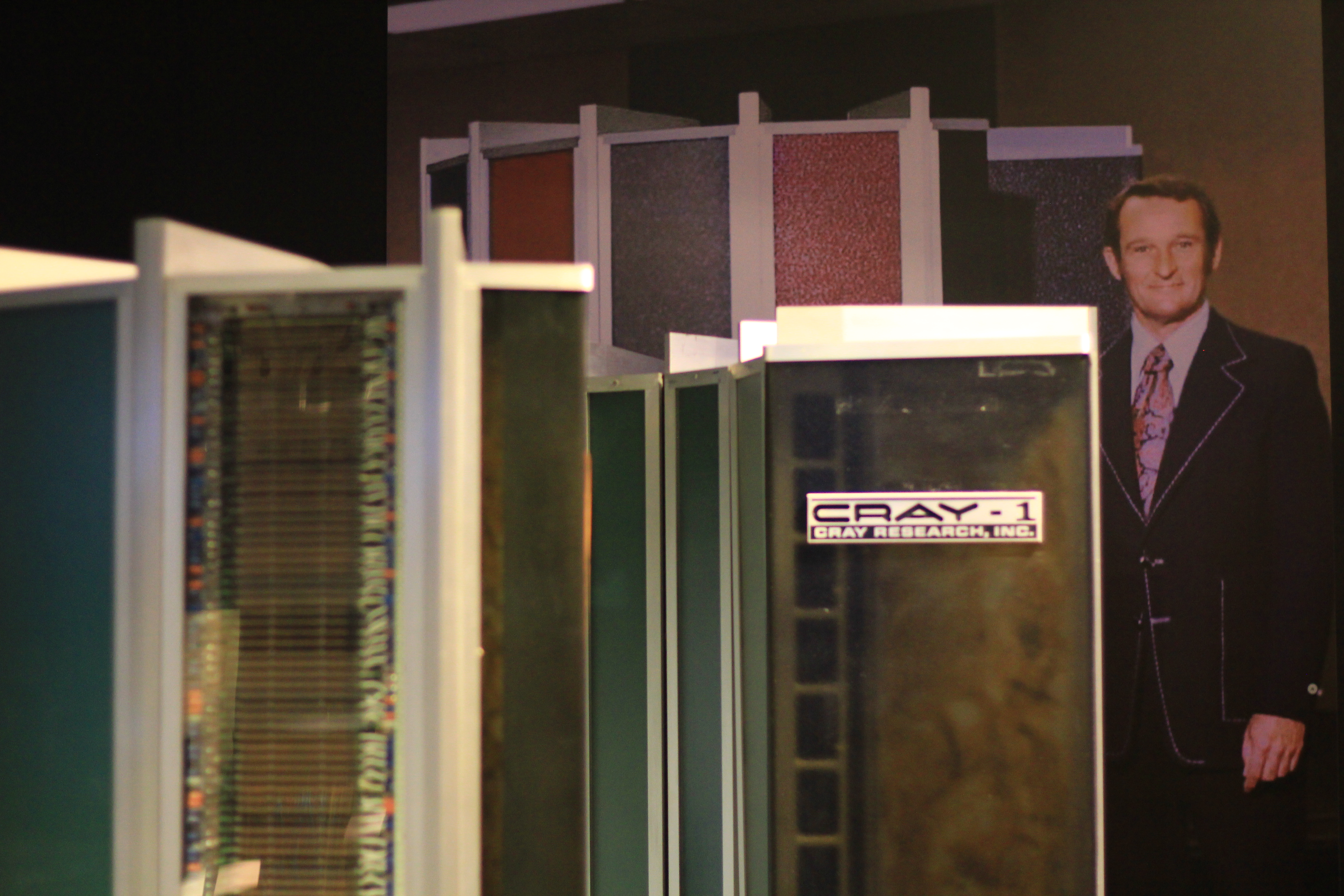
Seymour Cray with a Cray-1

The split was fairly amicable, and when he started Cray Research in a new laboratory on the same Chippewa property a year later, Norris invested $250,000 in start-up money. Like CDC's organization, Cray R&D was based in Chippewa Falls and business headquarters were in Minneapolis. Unlike CDC, Cray's manufacturing was also in Chippewa Falls.

At first there was some question as to what exactly the new company should do. It did not seem that there would be any way for them to afford to develop a new computer, given that the now-large CDC had been unable to support more than one. When the President in charge of financing traveled to Wall Street to look for seed money, he was surprised to find that Cray's reputation was very well known. Far from struggling for some role to play in the market, Cray would find the financial world more than willing to provide all the money needed to develop a new machine.

After several years of development, their first product was released in 1976 as the Cray-1. As with earlier Cray designs, the Cray-1 made sure that the entire computer was fast, as opposed to just the processor. When it was released it easily beat almost every machine in terms of speed, including the STAR-100 that had beaten the 8600 for funding. The only machine able to perform on the same sort of level was the ILLIAC IV, a specialized one-off machine that rarely operated near its maximum performance, except on very specific tasks. In general, the Cray-1 beat anything on the market by a wide margin.

Serial number 001 was "lent" to Los Alamos National Laboratory in 1976, and that summer the first full system was sold to the National Center for Atmospheric Research (NCAR) for $8.8 million. The company's early estimates had suggested that they might sell a dozen such machines, based on sales of similar machines from the CDC era, so the price was set accordingly. Eventually, well over 80 Cray-1s were sold, the company was a huge success financially, and Cray's innovations with super computers won him the nickname "The Wizard of Chippewa Falls".

Follow-up success was not as easy. While he worked on the Cray-2, other teams delivered the two-processor Cray X-MP, which was another huge success and later the four-processor X-MP. When the Cray-2 was finally released after six years of development it was only marginally faster than the X-MP, largely due to very fast and large main memory, and thus it sold in much smaller numbers. The Cray-2 ran at 250 MHz with a very deep pipeline, making it harder to write code than for the shorter-pipe X-MP.

As the Cray-3 project started, he found himself once again being "bothered" too much with day-to-day tasks. In order to concentrate on design, Cray left the CEO position of Cray Research in 1980 to become an independent contractor. In 1988, he moved the Cray-3 project from Chippewa Falls to a laboratory in Colorado Springs, Colorado.

In 1989, Cray was faced with a repeat of history when the Cray-3 started to run into difficulties. An upgrade of the X-MP using high-speed memory from the Cray-2 was under development and seemed to be making real progress, and once again management was faced with two projects and limited budgets. They eventually decided to take the safer route, releasing the new design as the Cray Y-MP.

=== Cray Computer Corporation ===
Logo of Cray Computer Corporation

Cray decided to spin off the Colorado Springs laboratory to form Cray Computer Corporation. This new entity took the Cray-3 project with them.

The 500 MHz Cray-3 proved to be Cray's second major failure. In order to provide the tenfold increase in performance that he always demanded of his newest machines, Cray decided that the machine would have to be built using gallium arsenide semiconductors. In the past Cray had always avoided using anything even near the state of the art, preferring to use well-known solutions and designing a fast machine based on them. In this case, Cray was developing every part of the machine, even the chips inside it.

Nevertheless, the team were able to get the machine working and delivered their first example to NCAR on 24 May 1993.

The machine was still essentially a prototype, and the company was using the installation to debug the design. By this time a number of massively parallel machines were coming into the market at price/performance ratios the Cray-3 could not touch. Cray responded through "brute force", starting design of the Cray-4, which would run at 1 GHz and outpower these machines, regardless of price.

In 1995 there had been no further sales of the Cray-3, and the ending of the Cold War made it unlikely anyone would buy enough Cray-4s to offer a return on the development funds. The company ran out of money and filed for Chapter 11 bankruptcy 24 March 1995.

=== SRC Computers ===
Cray had always resisted the massively parallel solution to high-speed computing, offering a variety of reasons that it would never work as well as one very fast processor. He famously quipped "If you were plowing a field, which would you rather use: two strong oxen or 1024 chickens?" By the mid-1990s, this argument was becoming increasingly difficult to justify, and modern compiler technology made developing programs on such machines not much more difficult than their simpler counterparts.

Cray set up a new company, SRC Computers, and started the design of his own massively parallel machine. The new design concentrated on communications and memory performance, the bottleneck that hampered many parallel designs. Design had just started when Cray was killed in a car accident. SRC Computers carried on development and specialized in reconfigurable computing.

=== Technical approaches ===
Cray frequently cited two important aspects to his design philosophy: remove heat, and ensure that all signals that are supposed to arrive somewhere at the same time do indeed arrive at the same time.

His computers were equipped with built-in cooling systems, extending ultimately to coolant channels cast into the mainframes and thermally coupled to metal plates within the circuit boards, and to systems immersed in coolants. In a story he told about himself, he realized early in his career that he should interlock the computers with the cooling systems so that the computers would not operate unless the cooling systems were operational. It did not originally occur to him to interlock in the other direction until a customer reported that localized power outages had shut down their computer, but left the cooling system running — so they arrived in the morning to find the machine encased in ice.

Cray addressed the problem of skew by ensuring that every signal path in his later computers was the same electrical length, so that values that were to be acted upon at a particular time were indeed all valid values. When required, he would run the traces back and forth on the circuit boards until the desired length was achieved, and he employed Maxwell's equations in design of the boards to ensure that any radio frequency effects which altered the signal velocity and hence the electrical path length were accounted for.

When asked what kind of CAD tools he used to design computers, Cray said that he liked pads of 8 1/2″ × 11″ "faintly-ruled 1/4-inch quadrille" paper.

=== List of computers ===
Cray was involved in the design of the following computers:

- ERA 1103 (1953)
- AN/USQ-17 (1958, not produced)
- CDC 1604 (1960)
- CDC 160 (1960)
- CDC 3000 series (1963)
- CDC 6600 (1964)
- CDC 7600 (1967)
- CDC 8600 (cancelled in 1974)
- Cray-1 (1976)
- Cray-2 (1985)
- Cray-3 (only one produced, 1993)
- Cray-4 (cancelled)
- Cray-3/SSS (cancelled)

== Personal life ==
Cray married Verene Voll in 1947. They had known each other since childhood. She was the daughter of a Methodist minister, as was Cray's mother, and Verene worked as a nutritionist. They had three children. Cray and Voll divorced around 1978. He later married Geri M. Harrand. Cray was the grandfather of Andrew Cray, an LGBTQ rights activist.

Cray avoided publicity. There are a number of unusual tales about his life away from work, termed "Rollwagenisms", from then-CEO of Cray Research, John A. Rollwagen. Cray enjoyed skiing, windsurfing, tennis, and other sports. Another favorite pastime was digging a tunnel under his home; he attributed the secret of his success to "visits by elves" while he worked in the tunnel: "While I'm digging in the tunnel, the elves will often come to me with solutions to my problem."

One story has it that when Cray was asked by management to provide detailed one-year and five-year plans for his next machine, he simply wrote, "Five-year goal: Build the biggest computer in the world. One year goal: One-fifth of the above." And another time, when expected to write a multi-page detailed status report for the company executives, Cray's two-sentence report read: "Activity is progressing satisfactorily as outlined under the June plan. There have been no significant changes or deviations from the June plan."

Cray was mortally wounded in a rollover accident while Cray was merging his Jeep Cherokee onto Interstate 25, near the Air Force Academy in Colorado. The accident was caused by another vehicle attempting to overtake Cray's vehicle, with police issuing the at-fault driver a citation for careless driving. Cray died of his injuries on October 5, 1996, two weeks after the accident and one week after his 71st birthday.

== Posthumous ==
The IEEE Computer Society's Seymour Cray Computer Engineering Award, established in late 1997, recognizes innovative contributions to high performance computing systems exemplifying Cray's creative spirit.

== See also ==
- Charles Babbage Institute
- Cray-3/SSS
- John Vincent Atanasoff
- List of pioneers in computer science
