= Cray-4 =

Supercomputer, never built

The Cray-4 was intended to be Cray Computer Corporation's successor to the failed Cray-3 supercomputer. It was marketed to compete with the T90 from Cray Research. CCC went bankrupt in 1995 before any Cray-4 had been delivered.

== Design ==
The earlier Cray-3 was the first major application of gallium arsenide (GaAs) semiconductors in computing. It was not considered a success, and only one Cray-3 was delivered. Seymour Cray moved on to the Cray-4 design, announcing the design in 1994.

The Cray-4 was essentially a shrunk and sped-up version of the Cray-3, consisting of a number of vector processors attached to a fast memory. The Cray-3 supported from four to sixteen processors running at 474 MHz, while the Cray-4 scaled from four to sixty-four processors running at 1 GHz. The final packaging for the Cray-4 was intended to fit into 1-cubic-foot (0.028 m^{3}), and was to be tested in the smaller one-CPU "tanks" from the Cray-3. A midrange system included 16 processors, 1,024 megawords (8192 MB) of memory and provided 32 gigaflops for $11 million.

The local memory architecture used on the Cray-2 and Cray-3 was dropped, returning to the mass of B- and T- registers on earlier designs, owing to Seymour's lack of success using the local memory effectively.

== 1994 ==
"Significant technical progress was made during 1994 on the CRAY-4, which takes advantage of technologies and manufacturing processes developed during the design and manufacture of the CRAY-3. The Company announced introduction of the CRAY-4 to the market on November 10, 1994. Several single processor CRAY-4 prototype systems, each with 64 megawords of memory, were undergoing diagnostic testing prior to the Company filing for bankruptcy. The Company began testing individual CRAY-4 modules at the start of 1994 and planned to be able to deliver a 4-processor CRAY-4 prototype system by approximately the end of the second quarter of 1995. Upon filing of bankruptcy, the Company stopped work on the CRAY-4."

== Legacy ==
The processor with serial number 001 sold at auction for $37,500 on 22 September 2015. Manufactured in 1995, it is believed to be the only one in existence. Parts of CPU prototypes exist. Marketing brochures also exist.
