= Cray-2 =

1985 supercomputer model

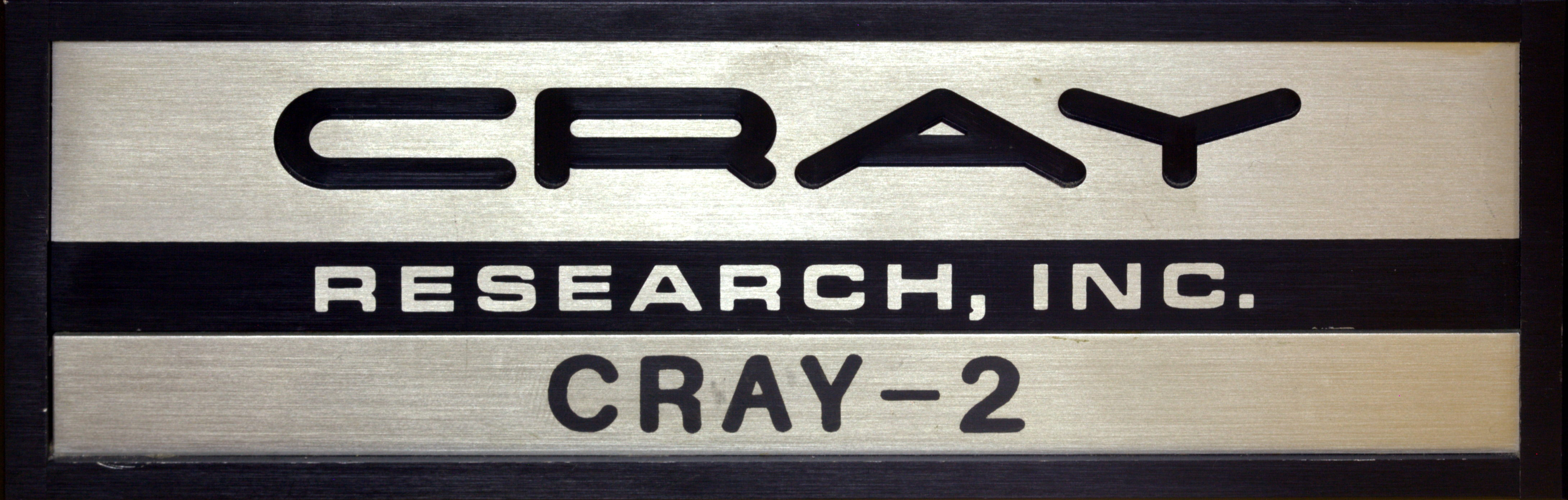

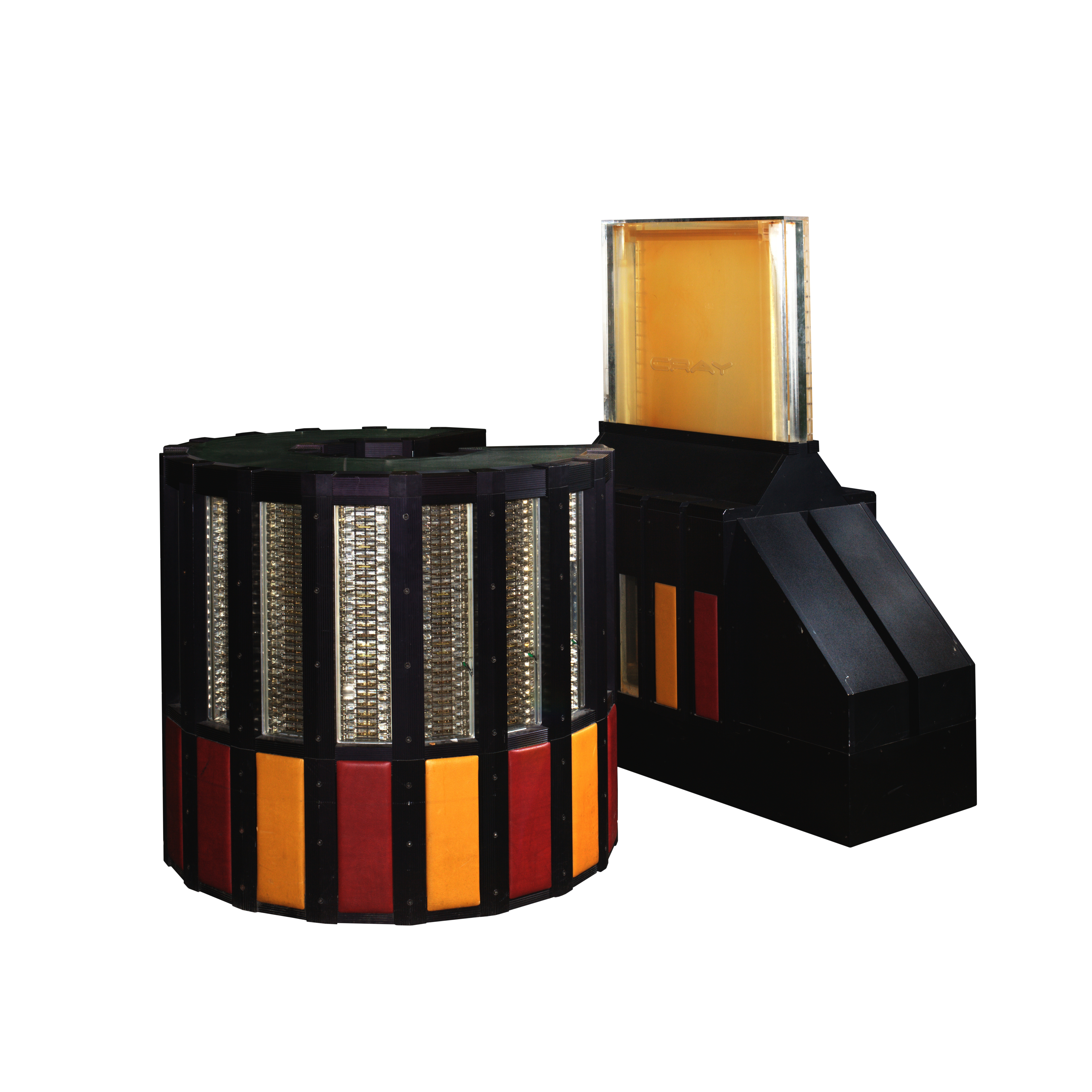
- Cray-2 central unit (foreground) and Fluorinert-cooling "waterfall" (background), on display at the EPFL.
- Manufacturer: Cray Research
- Type: Supercomputer
- Released: 1985
- Discontinued: 1990
- Units sold: 25
- CPU: Custom Vector Processors
- Predecessor: Cray X-MP

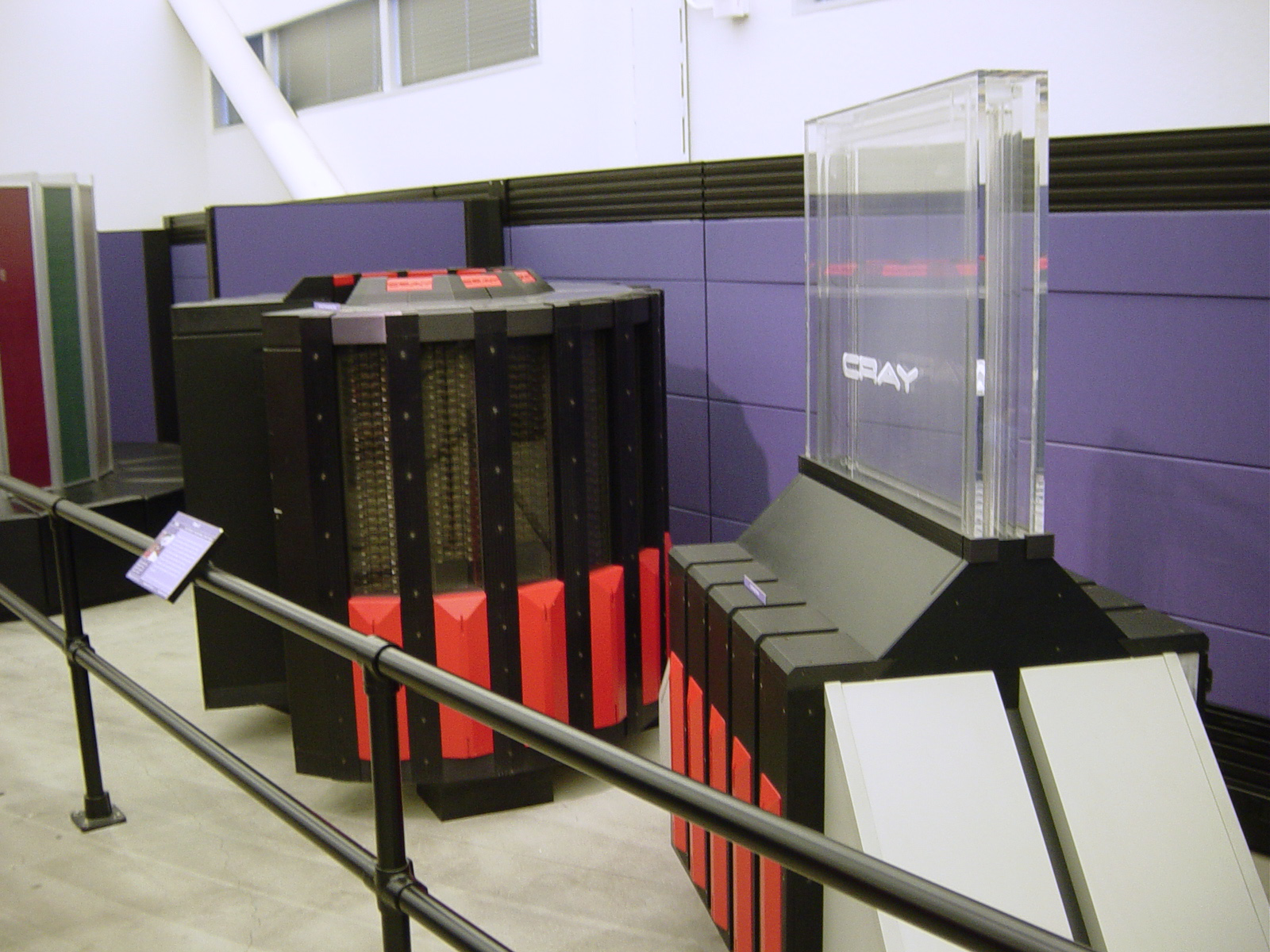
A Cray-2, serial number 2101 and its Fluorinert-cooling "waterfall", formerly of NERSC, the only 8-processor example ever made

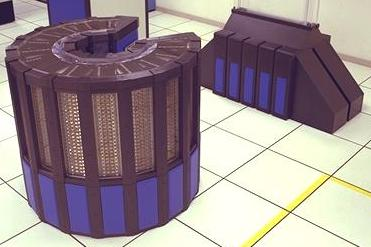
A Cray-2 operated by NASA

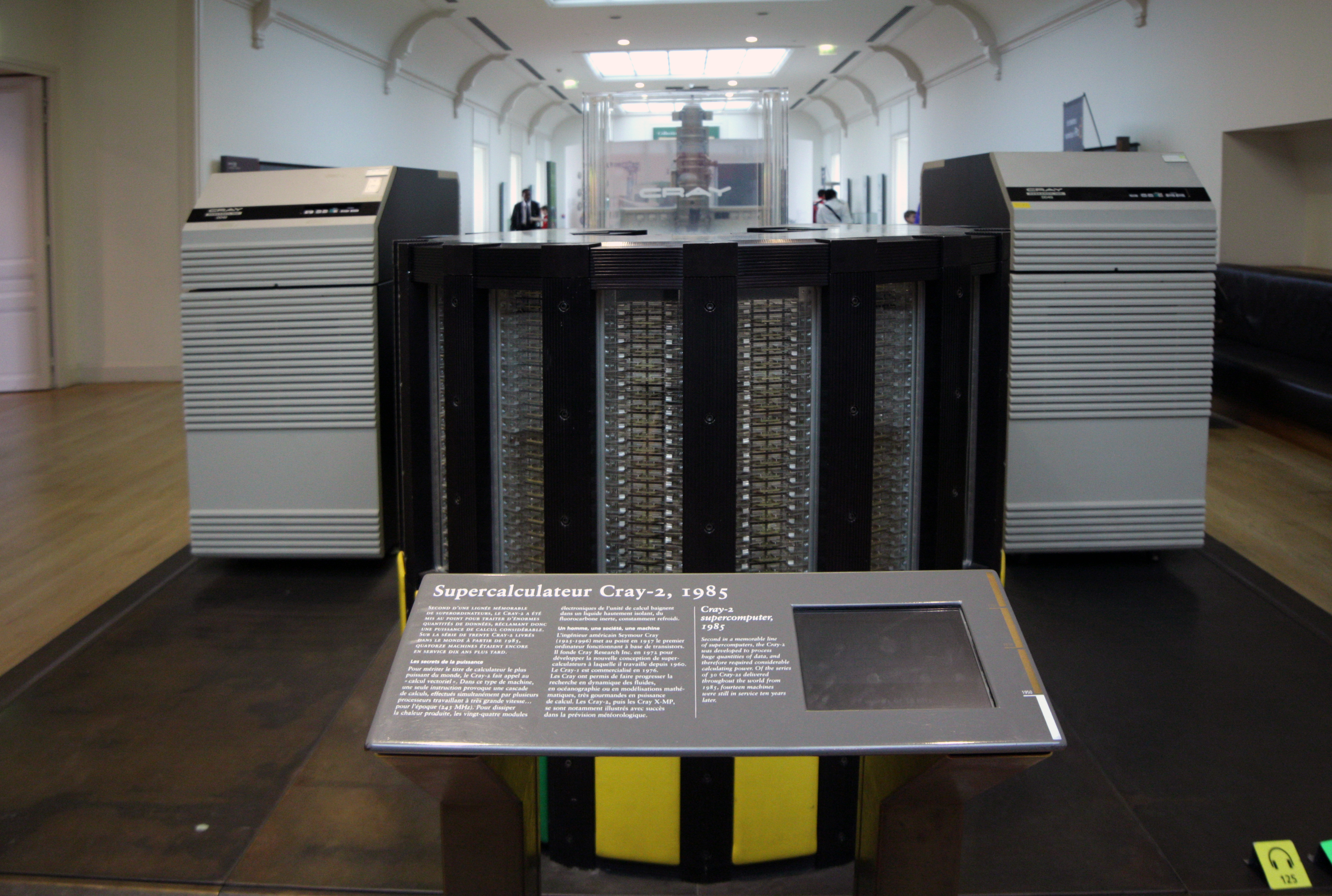
Front view of 1985 Supercomputer Cray-2, Musée des Arts et Métiers, Paris

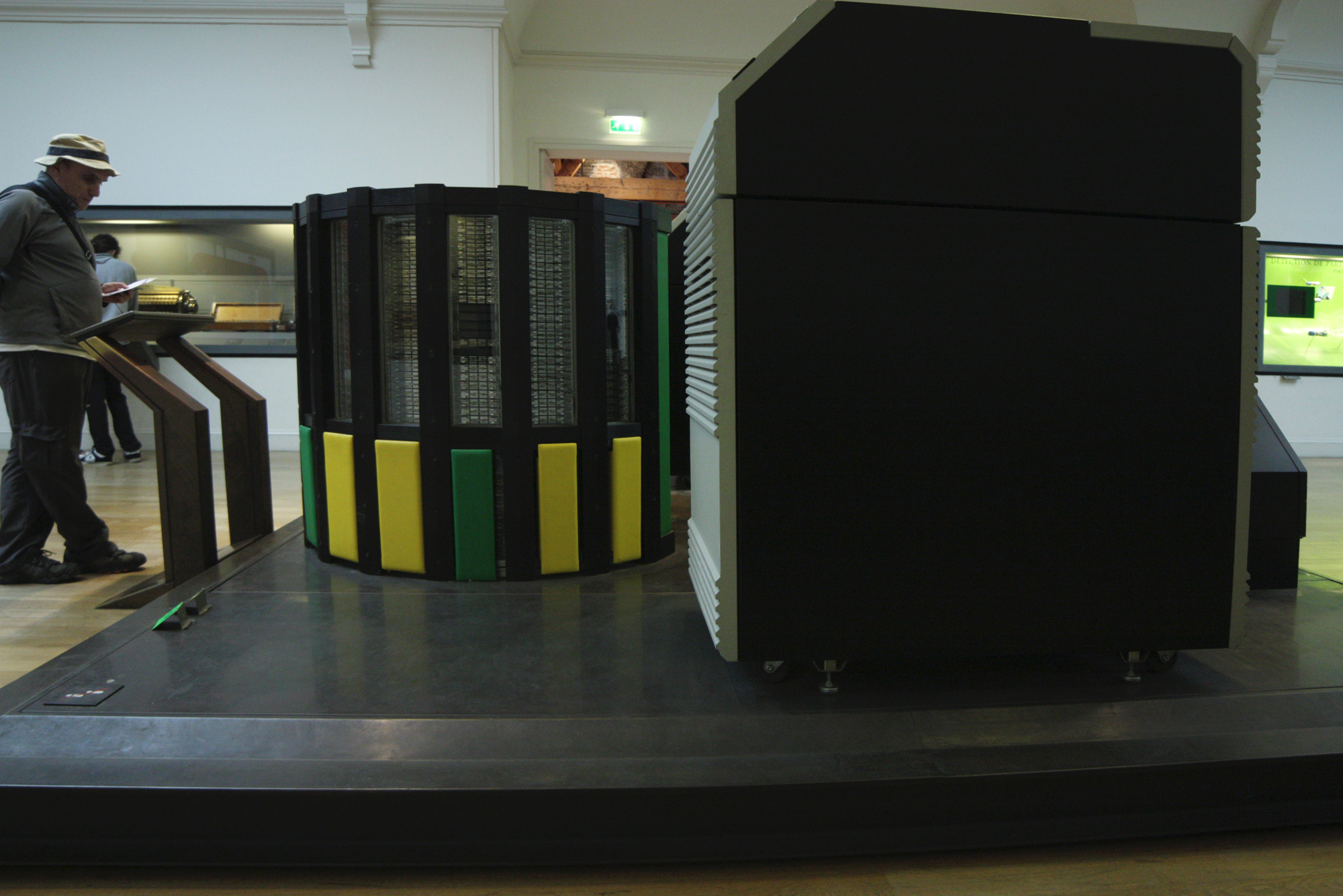
Side view of 1985 Supercomputer Cray-2, Musée des Arts et Métiers, Paris

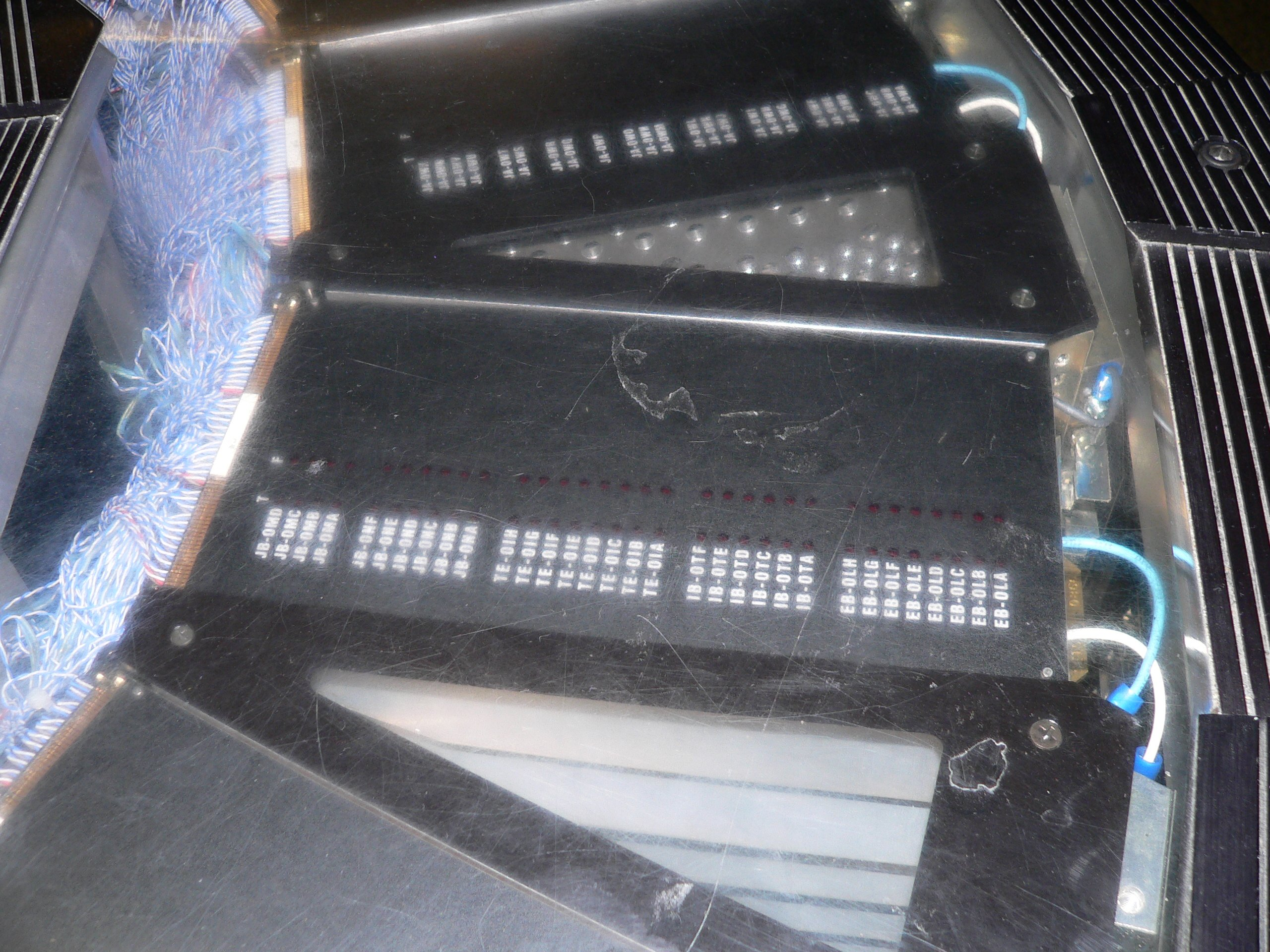
Detail of the upper part of the Cray-2

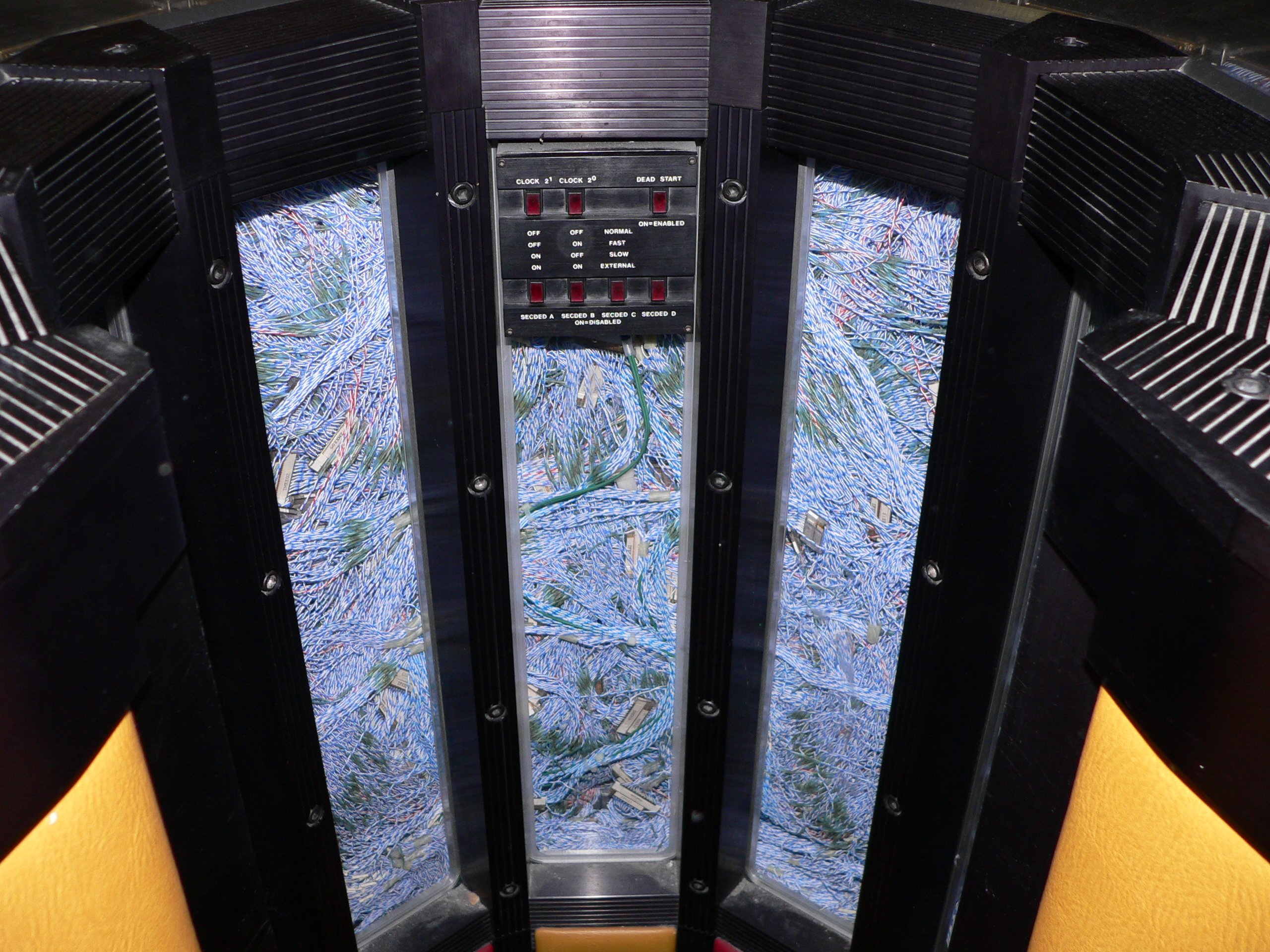
Inside of the Cray-2

The Cray-2 is a supercomputer with four vector processors made by Cray Research starting in 1985. At 1.9 GFLOPS peak performance, it was the fastest machine in the world when it was released, a title formerly held by the Cray X-MP. It was, in turn, surpassed by the Cray Y-MP in 1988.

The Cray-2 was the first of Seymour Cray's designs to successfully use multiple CPUs. This had been attempted in the CDC 8600 in the early 1970s, but the emitter-coupled logic (ECL) transistors of the era were too difficult to package into a working machine. The Cray-2 addressed this through the use of ECL integrated circuits, packing them in a novel 3D wiring that greatly increased circuit density.

The dense packaging and resulting heat loads were a major problem for the Cray-2. This was solved in a unique fashion by forcing the electrically inert Fluorinert liquid through the circuitry under pressure and then cooling it outside the processor box. The unique "waterfall" cooler system came to represent high-performance computing in the public eye and was found in many informational films and as a movie prop for some time.

Unlike the original Cray-1, the Cray-2 had difficulties delivering peak performance. Other machines from the company, like the X-MP and Y-MP, outsold the Cray-2 by a wide margin. When Cray began development of the Cray-3, the company chose to develop the Cray C90 series instead. This is the same sequence of events that occurred when the 8600 was being developed, and as in that case, Cray left the company.

== Initial design ==
With the successful launch of his famed Cray-1, Seymour Cray turned to the design of its successor. By 1979 he had become fed up with management interruptions in what was now a large company, and as he had done in the past, decided to resign his management post and move to form a new lab. As with his original move to Chippewa Falls, Wisconsin from Control Data HQ in Minneapolis, Minnesota, Cray management understood his needs and supported his move to a new lab in Boulder, Colorado. Working as an independent consultant at these new Cray Labs, starting in 1980 he put together a team and started on a completely new design. This lab would later close, and a decade later a new facility in Colorado Springs would open.

Cray had previously attacked the problem of increased speed with three simultaneous advances: more functional units to give the system higher parallelism, tighter packaging to decrease signal delays, and faster components to allow for a higher clock speed. The classic example of this design is the CDC 8600, which packed four CDC 7600-like machines based on ECL logic into a 1 × 1 meter cylinder and ran them at an 8 ns cycle speed (125 MHz). Unfortunately, the density needed to achieve this cycle time led to the machine's downfall. The circuit boards inside were densely packed, and since even a single malfunctioning transistor would cause an entire module to fail, packing more of them onto the cards greatly increased the chance of failure. Cooling the closely packed individual components also represented a major challenge.

One solution to this problem, one that most computer vendors had already moved to, was to use integrated circuits (ICs) instead of individual components. Each IC included a selection of components from a module pre-wired into a circuit by the automated construction process. If an IC did not work, another one would be tried. At the time the 8600 was being designed the simple MOSFET-based technology did not offer the speed Cray needed. Relentless improvements changed things by the mid-1970s, however, and the Cray-1 had been able to use newer ICs and still run at a respectable 12.5 ns (80 MHz). In fact, the Cray-1 was actually somewhat faster than the 8600 because it packed considerably more logic into the system due to the ICs' small size.

Although IC design continued to improve, the physical size of the ICs was constrained largely by mechanical limits; the resulting component had to be large enough to solder into a system. Dramatic improvements in density were possible, as the rapid improvement in microprocessor design was showing, but for the type of ICs used by Cray, ones representing a very small part of a complete circuit, the design had plateaued. In order to gain another 10-fold increase in performance over the Cray-1, the goal Cray aimed for, the machine would have to grow more complex. So once again he turned to an 8600-like solution, doubling the clock speed through increased density, adding more of these smaller processors into the basic system, and then attempting to deal with the problem of getting heat out of the machine.

Another design problem was the increasing performance gap between the processor and main memory. In the era of the CDC 6600 memory ran at the same speed as the processor, and the main problem was feeding data into it. Cray solved this by adding ten smaller computers to the system, allowing them to deal with the slower external storage (disks and tapes) and "squirt" data into memory when the main processor was busy. This solution no longer offered any advantages; memory was large enough that entire data sets could be read into it, but the processors ran so much faster than memory that they would often spend long times waiting for data to arrive. Adding four processors simply made this problem worse.

To avoid this problem the new design banked memory and two sets of registers (the B- and T-registers) were replaced with a 16 KWord block of the very fastest memory possible called a Local Memory, not a cache, attaching the four background processors to it with separate high-speed pipes. This Local Memory was fed data by a dedicated foreground processor which was in turn attached to the main memory through a Gbit/s channel per CPU; X-MPs by contrast had three, for two simultaneous loads and a store and Y-MP/C-90s had five channels to avoid the von Neumann bottleneck. It was the foreground processor's task to "run" the computer, handling storage and making efficient use of the multiple channels into main memory. It drove the background processors by passing in the instructions they should run via eight 16-word buffers, instead of tying up the existing cache pipes to the background processors. Modern CPUs use a variation of this design as well, although the foreground processor is now referred to as the load/store unit and is not a complete machine unto its own.

Main memory banks were arranged in quadrants to be accessed at the same time, allowing programmers to scatter their data across memory to gain higher parallelism. The downside to this approach is that the cost of setting up the scatter/gather unit in the foreground processor was fairly high. Stride conflicts corresponding to the number of memory banks suffered a performance penalty (latency) as occasionally happened in power-of-2 FFT-based algorithms. As the Cray 2 had a much larger memory than Cray 1s or X-MPs, this problem was easily rectified by adding an extra unused element to an array to spread the work out.

=== Packed circuit boards and new design ideas ===
Early Cray-2 models soon settled on a design using large circuit boards packed with ICs. This made them extremely difficult to solder together, and the density was still not enough to reach their performance goals. Teams worked on the design for about two years before even Cray himself "gave up" and decided it would be best if they simply canceled the project and fired everyone working on it. Les Davis, Cray's former design collaborator who had remained at Cray headquarters, decided it should be continued at low priority. After some minor personnel movements, the team continued on much as before.

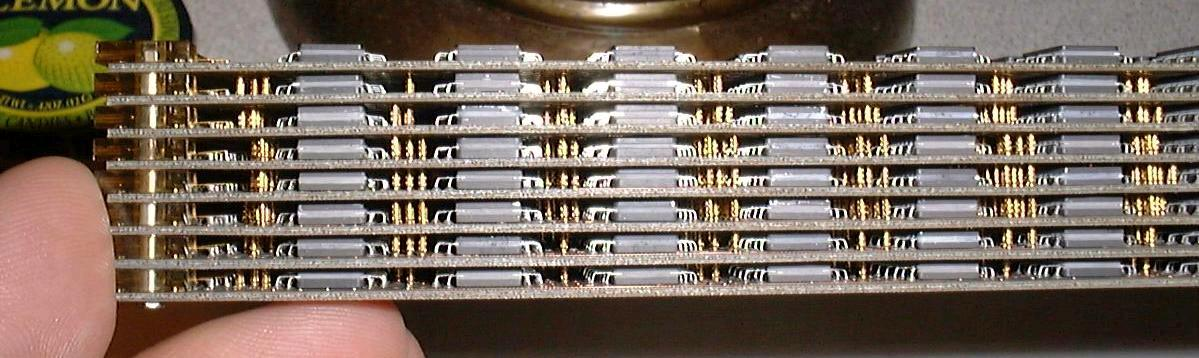
Typical logic module, showing the tight packing. The pogo pins connecting the cards together are the gold-colored rods seen between the ICs.

Six months later Cray had his "eureka" moment. He called the main engineers together for a meeting and presented a new solution to the problem. Instead of making one larger circuit board, each "card" would instead consist of a 3-D stack of eight, connected together in the middle of the boards using pins sticking up from the surface (known as "pogos" or "z-pins"). The cards were packed right on top of each other, so the resulting stack was only about 30 mm high.

With this sort of density there was no way any conventional air-cooled system would work; there was too little room for air to flow between the ICs. Instead the system would be immersed in a tank of a new inert liquid from 3M, Fluorinert. The cooling liquid was forced sideways through the modules under pressure, and the flow rate was roughly one inch per second. The heated liquid was cooled using chilled water heat exchangers and returned to the main tank. Work on the new design started in earnest in 1982, several years after the original start date.

While this was going on the Cray X-MP was being developed under the direction of Steve Chen at Cray headquarters, and looked like it would give the Cray-2 a serious run for its money. In order to address this internal threat, as well as a series of newer Japanese Cray-1-like machines, the Cray-2 memory system was dramatically improved, both in size as well as the number of "pipes" into the processors. When the machine was eventually delivered in 1985, the delays had been so long that much of its performance benefits were due to the faster memory. Purchasing the machine really made sense only for users with huge data sets to process.

The first Cray-2 delivered possessed more physical memory (256 MWord) than all previously delivered Cray machines combined. Simulation moved from a 2-D realm or coarse 3-D to a finer 3-D realm because computation did not have to rely on slow virtual memory.

== Uses and successors ==
The Cray-2 was predominantly developed for the United States Departments of Defense and Energy. Uses tended to be for nuclear weapons research or oceanographic (sonar) development. However, the first Cray-2 (serial number 1) was used at the National Magnetic Fusion Energy Computer Center at Lawrence Livermore National Laboratory for unclassified energy research. It also found its way into civil agencies (such as NASA Ames Research Center), universities, and corporations worldwide. For example, Ford and General Motors both used the Cray-2 for processing complex Finite Element Analysis models of car bodyshells, and for performing virtual crash testing of bodyshell components prior to production.

The Cray-2 would have been superseded by the Cray-3, but due to development problems only a single Cray-3 was built and it was never paid for. The spiritual descendant of the Cray-2 is the Cray X1, offered by Cray.

=== Comparison to later computers ===
In 2012, Piotr Luszczek (a former doctoral student of Jack Dongarra), presented results showing that an iPad 2 matched the historical performance of the Cray-2 on an embedded LINPACK benchmark.

== Trivia ==
Due to the use of liquid cooling, the Cray-2 was given the nickname "Bubbles", and common jokes around the computer made reference to this unique system. Gags included "No Fishing" signs, cardboard depictions of the Loch Ness Monster rising out of the heat exchanger tank, plastic fish inside the exchanger, etc. The power consumption of the Cray-2 was 150–200 kW. Research conducted at the Lawrence Livermore National Laboratory in the early 1990s indicated that to a limited extent the perfluorinated polyether used to cool Cray-2 circuits would break down to form the extremely toxic gas perfluoroisobutylene. At the time, Cray had created a poster showing the transparent "bubble chamber" that the cooling fluid was run through for visual effect, with a spill of the same material glistening on the floor—the joke was that if this actually occurred, the facility would have to be evacuated. The manufacturer of the liquid developed a scrubber that could be placed in line with the pump that would catalytically degrade this toxic breakdown product.

Each vertical stack of logic modules sat above a stack of power modules which powered 5 volt busbars, each of which delivered about 2200 amps. The Cray-2 was powered by two motor-generators, which took in 480 V three-phase.

== See also ==
- History of supercomputing

Records
Preceded by Cray X-MP/4; 713 megaflops	World's most powerful supercomputer 1985–1987	Succeeded by Cray Y-MP/832; 2.144 gigaflops
