= Herb Grosch =

American computer scientist

Herbert Reuben John Grosch (September 13, 1918 – January 18, 2010) was an early computer scientist, perhaps best known for Grosch's law, which he formulated in 1950. Grosch's Law is an aphorism that states "economy is as the square root of the speed."

== Biography ==
Born September 13, 1918, in Saskatoon, Saskatchewan, Grosch was the first baby to survive incubator Grosch moved to Midland, Ontario as a child, then Pembroke, then Chatham, and later Windsor, Ontario.

Grosch moved to the United States where he received his B.S. and PhD in astronomy from the University of Michigan in 1942. In 1945, he was hired by IBM to do backup calculations for the Manhattan Project working at Watson Scientific Computing Laboratory at Columbia University. According to an IBM history, he had been previously employed as an optical engineer in defense industry and was eager to return to research. In 1951, he went on to work on Project Whirlwind at MIT, and on other early computer projects at General Electric. Back at IBM, he served as their first space program manager in 1958-1959.

Grosch served as editor of the journal Computerworld from 1973 to 1976, and he was the president of the American Rocket Society (which became the American Institute of Aeronautics and Astronautics) and the Association for Computing Machinery from 1976 to 1978.

Grosch received the Association for Computing Machinery Fellows Award in 1995, and the citation that accompanied it read, "A computer pioneer who managed important space and technology projects, Grosch is respected for discovering and describing the relationship between speed and cost of computers."

He was the second scientist hired by IBM (after Wallace J. Eckert) and the first employee at that company with facial hair, at a time when beards were prohibited by IBM.

On Grosch's religious views, he was an atheist.

== Professorships ==
- Columbia University, 1946-1951
- Arizona State College, 1956
- Boston University, 1972
- NMSU Las Cruces, 1994
- University of Nevada, Las Vegas, 2002 (Distinguished)
- Institute for History and Philosophy of Science and Technology, University of Toronto, 2003-2010.

== Publications ==
- Elements and Ephemeris of Delaporte Object 1936 CA, with Maxwell, Allan D, Publications of the Observatory of the University of Michigan, Vol.6, No.11 (1937).
- Integration Orbit and Mean Elements of Jupiter's Eighth Satellite, Ph. D. dissertation, University of Michigan (April 1942).
- Positions of Pluto, with J.E. Willis, Astronomical Journal, Vol.50, No.14 (June 1942), pp. 14–15.
- Ray Tracing on IBM Punched Card Equipment, Journal of the Optical Society of America, Vol.35, 803A (1945).
- Bibliography on the Use of IBM Machines in Scientific Research, Statistics, and Education, IBM (1945).
- Harmonic Analysis by the Use of Progressive Digiting, Proceedings of the 1946 Research Forum, IBM (1946).
- The Orbit of the Eighth Satellite of Jupiter, Astronomical Journal, Vol.53, No.180 (1948) (a condensed published form of Grosch's 1942 Ph. D. thesis).
- Ray Tracing with the IBM Selective Sequence Electronic Calculator, Journal of the Optical Society of America, Vol.39, 1059A (1949).
- Multiplication of Small Matrices, IBM, New York (1 Jun 1949).
- Proceedings of the 1948 Scientific Computation Forum (ed.), IBM (1950).
- The Use of Optimum Interval Mathematical Tables, Proceedings of the 1948 Scientific Computation Forum, IBM (1950).
- Bibliography on Chebyshev Polynomials and Their Use as Optimum Approximation Functions, Proeceedings of the 1949 Scientific Computation Seminar, IBM (1951).
- A New Level of Instruction in Celestial Mechanics, Astronomical Journal, Vol.63 (1958).
- Computer: Bit Slices From a Life. Third Millennium Books. 1991. ISBN 0-88733-085-1. (Third edition online in 2003)
