= Numerical Wind Tunnel =

1993 supercomputer by Fujitsu and NAL

Numerical Wind Tunnel (数値風洞) was an early implementation of the vector parallel architecture developed in a joint project between National Aerospace Laboratory of Japan and Fujitsu. It was the first supercomputer with a sustained performance of close to 100 Gflop/s for a wide range of fluid dynamics application programs. It stood out at the top of the TOP500 during 1993-1996. With 140 cores, the Numerical Wind Tunnel reached a Rmax of 124.0 GFlop/s and a Rpeak of 235.8 GFlop/s in November 1993.

It consisted of parallel connected 166 vector processors with a gate delay as low as 60 ps in the Ga-As chips. The resulting cycle time was 9.5 ns. The processor had four independent pipelines each capable of executing two Multiply-Add instructions in parallel resulting in a peak speed of 1.7 Gflop/s per processor. Each processor board was equipped with 256 Megabytes of central memory.

Records
Preceded by Thinking Machines CM-5/1024; 59.7 gigaflops	World's most powerful supercomputer November 1993	Succeeded by Intel Paragon XP/S140; 143.4 gigaflops
Preceded by Intel Paragon XP/S140; 143.4 gigaflops	World's most powerful supercomputer November 1994 – December 1995	Succeeded by Hitachi SR2201; 220.4 gigaflops
