= Xbox One =

Home video game console

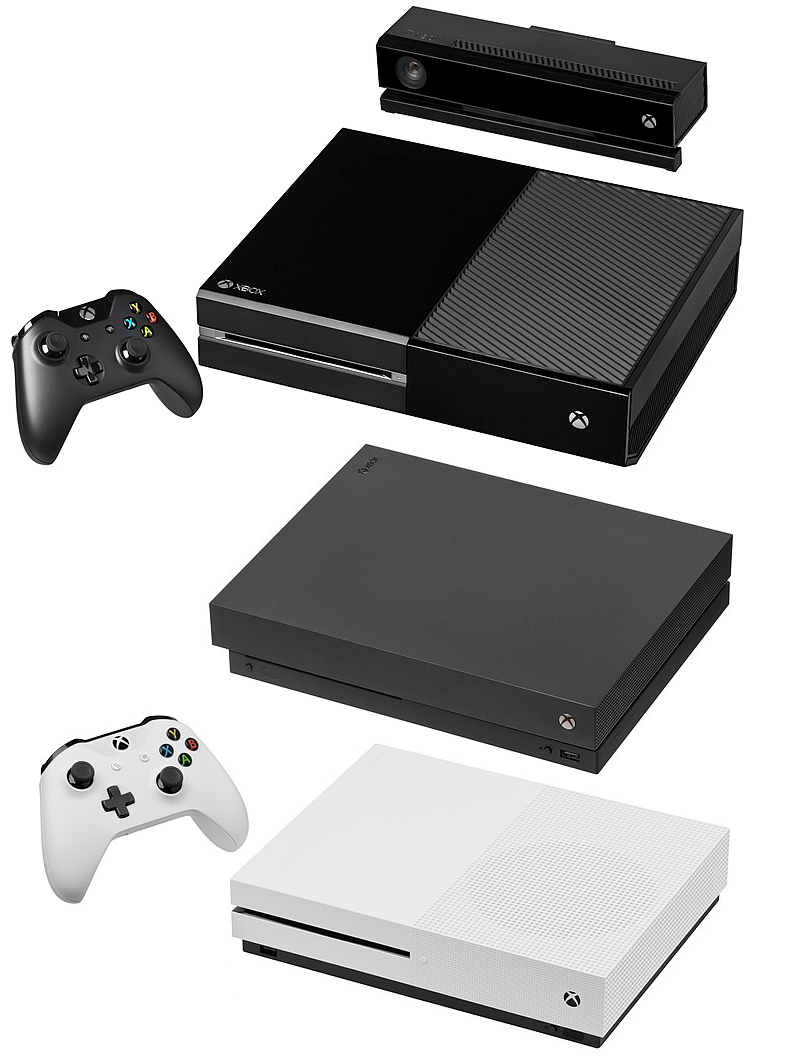
- Top: original Xbox One with Kinect sensor Middle: Xbox One X Bottom: Xbox One S
- Developer: Microsoft
- Manufacturer: Flextronics, Foxconn
- Product family: Xbox
- Type: Home video game console
- Generation: Eighth
- Released: NA/EU/AU/SA: November 22, 2013; JP: September 4, 2014; CHN: September 29, 2014
- Introductory price: US$499 (equivalent to $690 in 2025) €499
- Discontinued: 2020
- Units sold: See Sales section
- Units shipped: 58 million
- Media: All models: Blu-ray, DVD, CD, Digital distribution; S & X: UHD Blu-ray
- Operating system: Xbox System Software
- CPU: Original & S: 1.75 GHz 8-core AMD APU (2 × quad-core Jaguar modules); X: 2.3 GHz 8-core AMD APU (2 × quad-core Evolved Jaguar modules)
- Memory: Original & S: 8 GB DDR3 (5 GB available to games); X: 12 GB GDDR5 (9 GB available to games)
- Storage: Original: 500 GB or 1 TB HDD; Elite: 1 TB SSHD; S: 500 GB, 1 TB or 2 TB HDD; X: 1 TB HDD
- Display: All models: 720p and 1080p; S & X: 1440p and 4K UHD
- Graphics: AMD Radeon (built into APU); Original: GCN 853 MHz, 1.3 TFLOPS; S: GCN 914 MHz, 1.4 TFLOPS; X: GCN 40 CUs @ 1.172 GHz, 6 TFLOPS
- Sound: 7.1 surround sound, Dolby Atmos, DTS:X
- Input: HDMI
- Controller input: Xbox Wireless Controller, Kinect, keyboard, mouse
- Camera: 1080p camera (Kinect)
- Connectivity: All models: Gigabit Ethernet, 3 × USB 3.0, S/PDIF out, IR-out; Original: Wi-Fi 802.11n, HDMI 1.4b, Kinect port; S & X: Wi-Fi 802.11ac; S: HDMI 2.0a; X: HDMI 2.0b
- Current firmware: 10.0.25398.2923
- Online services: Xbox Live, Xbox Game Pass
- Dimensions: Original: 3.1 × 13.1 × 10.8 in (79 × 333 × 274 mm); S: 2.5 × 11.6 × 9.0 in (64 × 295 × 229 mm); X: 2.36 × 11.81 × 9.45 in (60 × 300 × 240 mm)
- Weight: Original: 7.7 lb (3.5 kg); S: 6.4 lb (2.9 kg); X: 9.8 lb (4.4 kg)
- Best-selling game: Grand Theft Auto V (10.98 million) (Note: Of the 90 million total units sold by April 2018, 12.2% of that total were for the Xbox One version.) (list)
- Backward compatibility: Selected Xbox and Xbox 360 games
- Predecessor: Xbox 360
- Successor: Xbox Series X/S
- Website: xbox.com/xbox-one

The Xbox One is a home video game console developed by Microsoft. Announced in May 2013, it is the successor to Xbox 360 and the third console in the Xbox series. It was first released in North America, parts of Europe, Australia, and South America in November 2013 and in Japan, China, and other European countries in September 2014. It is the first Xbox game console to be released in China, specifically in the Shanghai Free-Trade Zone. Microsoft marketed the device as an "all-in-one entertainment system", hence the name "Xbox One". An eighth-generation console, it mainly competed against Sony's PlayStation 4 and Nintendo's Wii U and Switch.

Moving away from its predecessor's PowerPC-based architecture, the Xbox One marks a shift back to the x86 architecture used in the original Xbox; it features an Accelerated Processing Unit (APU) from AMD built around the x86-64 instruction set. Xbox One's controller was redesigned over the Xbox 360's, with a redesigned body, D-pad, and triggers capable of delivering directional haptic feedback. The console places an increased emphasis on cloud computing, as well as social networking features and the ability to record and share video clips or screenshots from gameplay or livestream directly to streaming services such as Mixer and Twitch. Games can also be played off-console via a local area network on supported Windows 10 devices. The console can play Blu-ray Disc, and overlay live television programming from an existing set-top box or a digital tuner for digital terrestrial television with an enhanced program guide. The console optionally included a redesigned Kinect sensor, marketed as the "Kinect 2.0", providing improved motion tracking and voice recognition.

The Xbox One received positive reviews for its controller design, multimedia features and quieter internals, but criticism was initially given to its user interface. A revised version replaced the original in 2016, called the Xbox One S, which has a smaller form factor and support for HDR10 high-dynamic-range video, as well as support for 4K video playback and upscaling of games from 1080p to 4K. It was praised for its smaller size, its on-screen visual improvements, and its lack of an external power supply, but its regressions such as the lack of a native Kinect port were noted. A high-end model, named Xbox One X, was unveiled in June 2017 and released in November; it features upgraded hardware specifications and support for rendering games at 4K resolution. The system was succeeded by the Xbox Series X and Series S consoles, which launched on November 10, 2020. Production of all Xbox One consoles ceased at the end of that year.

== History ==
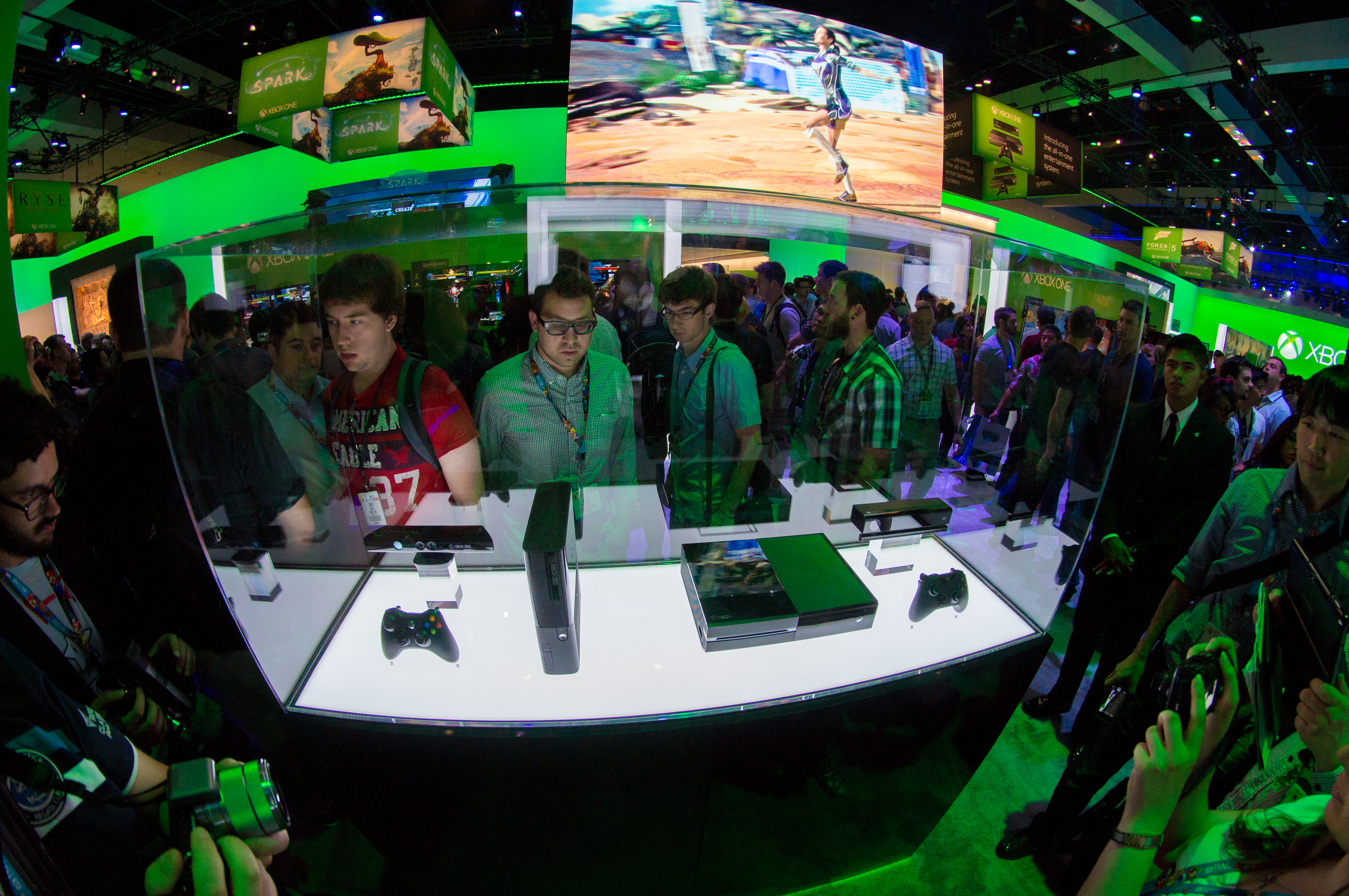
Xbox One at E3 2013 alongside the Xbox 360 E model

The Xbox One is the successor to Xbox 360, Microsoft's previous video game console, which was introduced in November 2005 as part of the seventh generation of video game consoles. Over the years, the 360 had received a number of small hardware revisions to reduce the unit's size and improve its reliability. In 2010, Microsoft's Chris Lewis stated that the 360 was about "halfway" through its lifecycle; this was aided by the introduction of the Kinect motion sensor that year, which Lewis stated would extend the lifecycle by five years.

Initial hardware for the 360's successor, commonly referred to by the industry as the "Xbox 720", was reportedly under development as early as May 2011. The official developer kit was codenamed Durango, and appeared to be available to developers by mid-2012. Leaked documents suggested that the new console would include an improved Kinect sensor, cloud access to games and media, integration with phone and tablet devices, and technology to provide players heads-up displays on glasses worn by the player, codenamed "Fortaleza"; Microsoft did not comment on these reported features. Leaked design documents also suggested that Microsoft was seeking to eliminate the ability to play used games, though Microsoft later clarified it was still reviewing the design and were "thinking about what is next and how we can push the boundaries of technology like we did with Kinect", but did not comment on the validity of the information.

=== Initial unveiling and launch ===
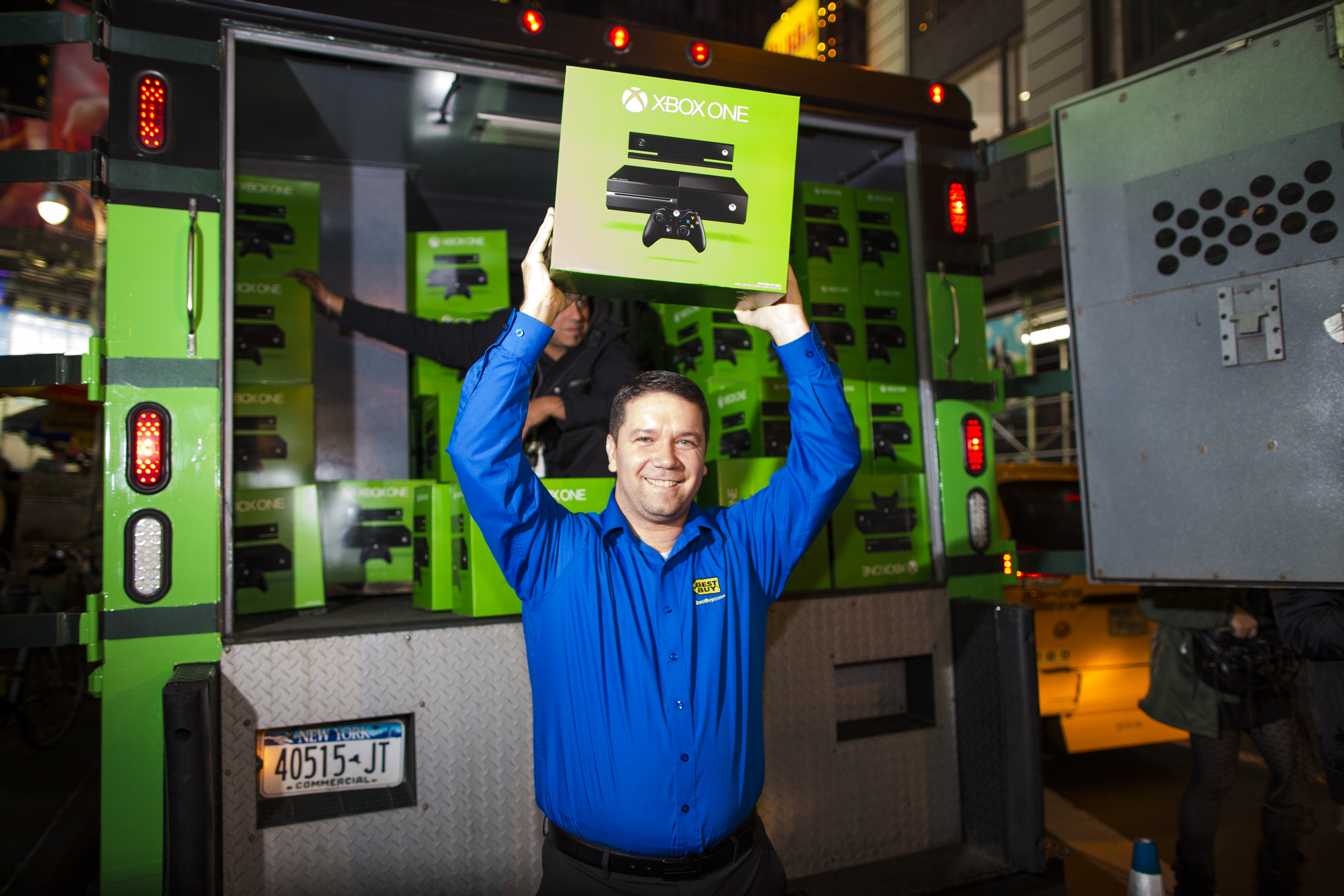
Best Buy employees unload Xbox One consoles from an armored truck during the official launch event in New York City, November 2013.

Prior to the official unveiling, a rumor had circulated that the next Xbox console would be an "always on" system requiring a persistent Internet connection, though Microsoft had not confirmed this. This had drawn some concerns from consumers, which were heightened when Microsoft Studios employee Adam Orth stated in a Twitter message in April 2013 that said, "Sorry, I don't get the drama around having an 'always on' console...Every device now is 'always on.' That's the world we live in. #dealwithit". Orth's message drew further ire towards Microsoft, with concerns about digital rights management and practices against the sale of used games with an "always on" unit. Orth opted to leave Microsoft a few days later due to the backlash. Despite Microsoft's statements following the situation, denying the rumors, the mood it created lingered over the next several months.

In a press conference on May 21, 2013, the new console was publicly unveiled under the name Xbox One and was presented as an all-in-one home entertainment device. The event focused heavily on the device's multimedia capabilities, demonstrating integration with television for over 30 minutes before any video games were shown. In a 2019 interview, Phil Spencer, head of Xbox at Microsoft, recalled that this approach not only confused consumers about the intent of the Xbox One, but also Microsoft employees who had been working on the console. Spencer stated that several employees complained to him about the presentation "blow[ing] up all the good work that [they]'ve done by talking about the product in a way that's not really matching what the soul of an Xbox console is about and what [their] customers are looking for from [Microsoft]".

As a result of the negative feedback from the May presentation, the press event for E3 2013 focused on the video game functionality of the Xbox One first and foremost; Don Mattrick, then Microsoft's president of Interactive Entertainment Business, described the event as "all about the games". At the event, Microsoft announced that the console would be released in 21 different markets on November 22, 2013, but this was later amended down to 13. The change, which pushed the release date for the other eight markets to 2014, was attributed to unforeseen complexity in localizing the device's voice recognition capabilities. In September 2014, the Xbox One was released in 26 markets, including remaining markets in Europe, the Japanese market, and Middle Eastern markets.

Microsoft initially announced a different game licensing scheme for Xbox One than what was used upon its release: all games, including those purchased at retail, would be bound to the user's Xbox Live account. Users could access their purchased games from any other Xbox One console, play games without their disc once installed, and allow users to "share" their games with up to ten designated "family" members. If a publisher allowed a game to be traded or resold, users could do this at "participating retailers", and could also transfer a game directly to any Xbox Live friend who had been on their list for at least 30 days, but only once per game. To synchronize licenses, the console would be required to connect to the internet once every 24 hours; if the console could not connect, all games would be disabled until the console was connected again.

Reaction to this digital rights management scheme was extremely negative in light of the previous concerns about the "always on" console from earlier in the year. Critics felt that the changes would infringe on consumers' first-sale rights for games purchased on physical media, as games would only be licensed to users rather than sold, and the disc itself would only be used to install the game and not confer ownership of its license or permission to resell. Microsoft also stated that game publishers would decide whether the physical copies of their games would be eligible for resale, and could impose restrictions or activation fees on second-hand copies of games. In addition, loaning or renting games would not be possible at the console's launch, and Microsoft was "exploring the possibilities" with its partners. GameSpot editor Tom McShea went on to say that Microsoft had become anti-consumerist, trying to "punish their loyal customers" with strict restrictions, and that "by saying no to the used game restrictions and always-online that Microsoft is so happily implementing on the Xbox One, Sony has elevated the PlayStation 4 as the console to grab this holiday season." Xbox Chief Marketing and Strategy Officer Yusuf Mehdi explained that the system was built with digital distribution in mind, but that Microsoft wanted to maintain the availability of games on physical media. He also noted that Microsoft was not "giving in" to publishers' objections to used games, but rather trying to balance the needs of consumers and the industry, and that the trading and sharing abilities of the platform added a level of flexibility not seen on other online distribution platforms at the time.

On June 19, 2013, shortly after E3 2013, Microsoft announced (in response to the negative reaction) that it would change its Xbox One DRM policy and game licensing model and reverse course. As with the Xbox 360, users would be able to share and resell physical games without restrictions, and beyond a mandatory software update upon the console's initial setup process to enable playback of Blu-ray and DVD video, the console would not require a permanent internet connection to operate. These changes required the family sharing features, along with the ability to play games without their disc after installation, to be dropped. Xbox One chief product officer Marc Whitten stated that the family sharing feature may return in the future, but could not be implemented on launch due to time restraints. Don Mattrick, then president of Microsoft's Interactive Entertainment Business, stated that the licensing changes were in response to the negative public reaction. Other analysts believed the change was in direct response to Sony's aggressive position during its E3 conference. On July 1, 2013, Mattrick, who had been a leader in development on the Xbox One, announced his departure from Microsoft to become CEO of Zynga. Analysts speculated that his departure was predicated on the poor response and subsequent reversal of the plans for Xbox One.

Microsoft also backtracked on a similarly controversial requirement for the Kinect sensor to be plugged into the Xbox One at all times for it to function. Privacy advocates argued that Kinect sensor data could be used for targeted advertising and to perform unauthorized surveillance on users. In response to these claims, Microsoft reiterated that Kinect voice recognition and motion tracking can be disabled by users, that Kinect data cannot be used for advertising under its privacy policy, and that the console would not redistribute user-generated content without permission. Alongside the above changes, the Xbox One did not require the Kinect to be plugged in to operate by launch, though the initial bundles still included the Kinect device.

In response to these pre-launch changes and a belief that Microsoft's initial decisions for the console were in poor judgement, journalists and consumers jokingly gave the Xbox One nicknames such as the "Xbox 180", in reference to the Xbox 360 and Microsoft's decision to reverse its controversial decisions, and "Xbone", suggesting that the company was "throwing a bone" to consumers by making these changes.

=== Subsequent updates ===
In 2015, four members of an international hacking group pleaded guilty to gaining unauthorized access to Microsoft's computer network and obtaining sensitive information relating to Xbox One and Xbox Live. At the time of the security breach, Microsoft was in the development stage for its next-generation gaming system. Between 2011 and 2013, the hackers spent hundreds of hours searching through Microsoft's network copying log-in credentials, source code, technical specifications, and other data. Group members say they were driven by an immense curiosity about Microsoft's then-unreleased Xbox One console and associated software. "Using stolen access credentials", two of the hackers also committed a physical theft by entering "a secure building on Microsoft's Redmond Washington campus" and carrying away three "Durango" development kits.

On June 13, 2016, during its E3 2016 press conference, Microsoft unveiled Xbox One S, a revision of the original Xbox One hardware with a streamlined form factor and support for HDR10 and 4K video. The Xbox One S replaced the original launch hardware which had been discontinued around the same time. Microsoft also teased a high-end version of Xbox One with upgraded hardware codenamed "Project Scorpio", which was unveiled and released the following year as Xbox One X. After failing to attract interest from game developers and users, Microsoft had also begun to phase out Kinect from the consumer market—removing the proprietary connector used by the device on these newer Xbox One models, and requiring a special adapter to break the connector out into USB and AC power connections.

Microsoft unveiled the Xbox One S All-Digital Edition on April 16, 2019, which included three digital games, Forza Horizon 3, Sea of Thieves, and Minecraft. The console does not have a physical disc drive, and all games must be downloaded. It is $50 cheaper than the Xbox One S at $249 and was made available on May 7, 2019.

Microsoft ended production of the Xbox One family throughout 2020 in preparation for production of future hardware.

== Hardware ==
=== Design ===
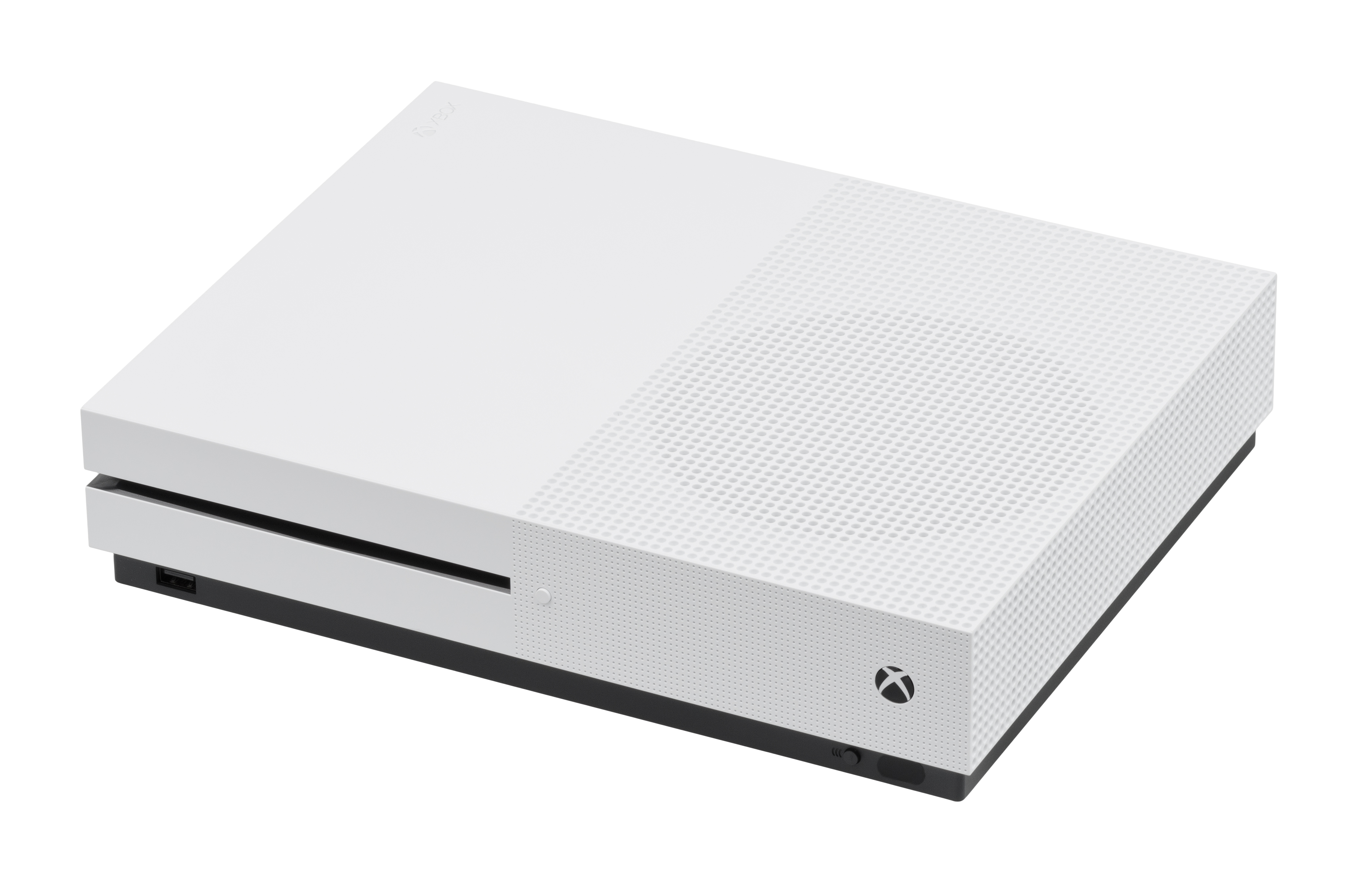
The Xbox One S features a smaller casing and other design changes over the original Xbox One model.

The original Xbox One's exterior casing consists of a two-tone "liquid black" finish; with half finished in a matte grey, and the other in a glossier black. The matte side of the top of the console consists of a large air vent. The design was intended to evoke a more entertainment-oriented and simplified look than previous iterations of the console; among other changes, the LED rings used by Xbox 360 are replaced by a glowing white Xbox logo used to communicate the system's status to the user. Due to the overall ventilation design of the console, the original Xbox One is designed to only sit horizontally.

Xbox One S utilizes a refreshed version of this design, with a case that is 40% smaller in size and supports vertical orientation with a stand. The main Xbox One S SKU is colored in an entirely matte "Robot White" finish, with half of the console adorned with machined holes, and a visible circular vent on top of the console's right half. It utilizes push-button controls rather than capacitive keys, the side USB port and controller sync button were moved to the front of the console, and its power supply is integrated into the console's casing rather than sitting externally (plugging directly into an outlet rather than using an external "brick").

=== Internals ===
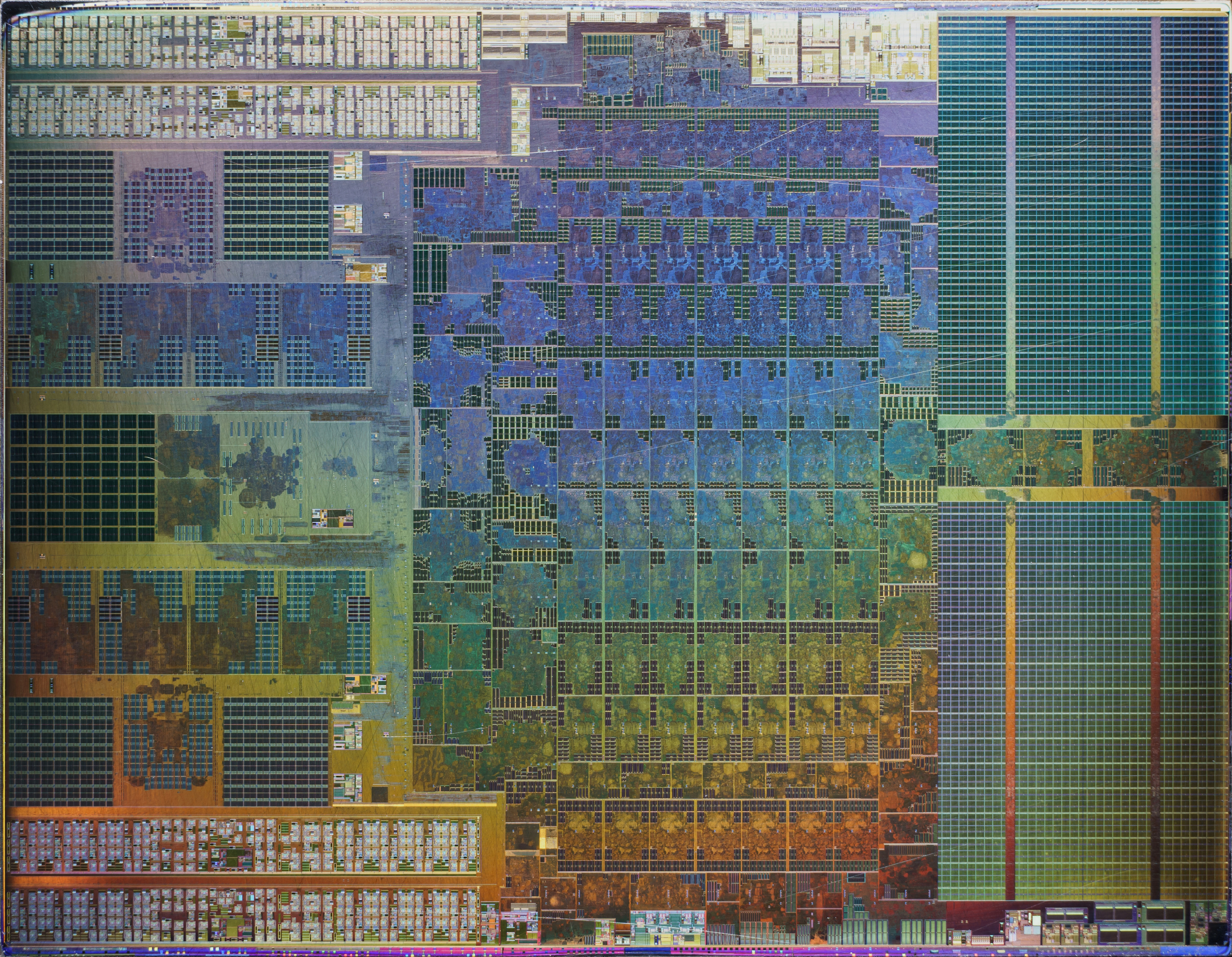
Die shot of the AMD 28nm Jaguar APU

The Xbox One is powered by an AMD "Jaguar" Accelerated Processing Unit (APU) with two quad-core modules totaling eight x86-64 cores clocked at 1.75 GHz, and 8 GB of DDR3 RAM with a memory bandwidth of 68.3 GB/s. The APU is built on TSMC's 28nm process. The memory subsystem also features an additional 32 MB of "embedded static" RAM, or ESRAM, with a memory bandwidth of 109 GB/s. For simultaneous read and write operations, the ESRAM is capable of a theoretical memory bandwidth of 192 GB/s and a memory bandwidth of 133 GB/s has been achieved with operations that involved alpha transparency blending. The system includes a non-replaceable hard drive and a Blu-ray Disc optical drive. 138 GB of hard drive space is used by the operating system, with the remainder available for the storage of games. Since the June 2014 software update, up to two USB drives can be connected to Xbox One to expand its capacity. External drives must support USB 3.0 and have a capacity of at least 256 GB.

It was reported that 3 GB of RAM would be reserved for the operating system and utility software, leaving 5 GB for games. With DirectX 11.2 as the console's API, the graphics processing unit (GPU) is based on an AMD GCN architecture with 12 compute units, which have a total of 768 cores, running at 853 MHz providing an estimated peak theoretical power of 1.31 TFLOPS. For networking, Xbox One supports Gigabit Ethernet, 802.11n wireless, and Wi-Fi Direct.

"We purposefully did not target the highest-end graphics. We targeted more as a broad entertainment play and did it in an intelligent way."

— Greg Williams, GM of Xbox silicon development

The original Xbox One supports 1080p and 720p video output; unlike the Xbox 360, the Xbox One does not support 1080i and other interlaced resolutions. Xbox One supports HDMI 1.4 for both input and output, and does not support composite or component video. Xbox One supports 7.1 surround sound, Dolby Atmos, and DTS:X.

Xbox One S additionally supports 2160p (4K resolution) video output, and high dynamic range (HDR) color using HDR10 (with a future update to add Dolby Vision HDR support for streaming video). 4K video can be played from supported streaming services and Ultra HD Blu-ray Disc, however, since Xbox One S is a first-generation Ultra HD Blu-ray player, it cannot output the dynamic HDR10+ or Dolby Vision metadata from a disc encoded with either or both formats (such discs play only in standard HDR10.) Games are upscaled from 1080p resolution, and are not rendered at 4K. The GPU on Xbox One S has a higher clock speed and ESRAM bandwidth than the original model, which can provide some performance improvements on games with dynamic resolution scaling (DRS) or uncapped frame rates.

The console can monitor its internal temperature and adjust accordingly to prevent overheating; alongside increasing fan speed, additional measures can be taken, including throttling the hardware to a low-power state—a feature that was not present on Xbox 360. Restricting power consumption lowers maximum performance, but the setting would be intended as a last resort to prevent permanent hardware damage.

=== Controller ===
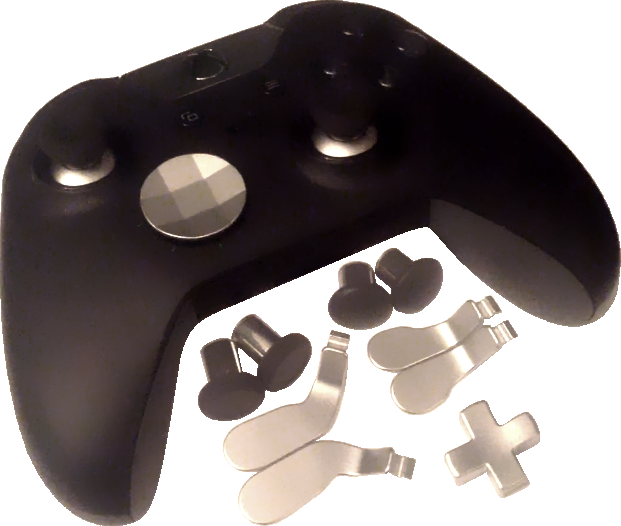
Xbox Elite Wireless Controller, featuring two unique pairs of analog sticks, a new D-pad and two differently sized pairs of paddles

The Xbox Wireless Controller maintains the overall layout found in the Xbox 360's controller, but with various refinements to its form. Among its changes include a smoother form, textured analog sticks, a four-way directional pad, and redesigned triggers and shoulder buttons with a curved shape for ergonomics. "Menu" and "View" buttons have replaced the Start and Back buttons. Each trigger features independent rumble motors called "Impulse Triggers", which allows developers to program directional vibration. One trigger can be made to vibrate when firing a gun, or both can work together to create feedback that indicates the direction of an incoming hit. The controller also contains light emitters that allow it to be tracked and paired using the Kinect sensor, and to detect when it's not being held to automatically enter a low-power state. An updated revision of the controller was released in June 2015, which includes a 3.5-millimeter headphone jack and other minor changes. A third revision was introduced alongside and first bundled with Xbox One S, with textured grips and Bluetooth support.

The Xbox Wireless Controller includes a micro USB port; when attached via a micro-USB cable, the controller can operate without battery power and can charge remotely, and is supported on computers running Windows 7 or later with drivers. The Xbox One Wireless Adapter accessory allows wireless use of Xbox One controllers on Windows computers also running Windows 7 or later.

The Elite Wireless Controller was released in October 2015. It was described and marketed as "an elite controller for the elite gamer", containing interchangeable parts, "hair trigger locks" for the triggers that allow users to reduce the amount of distance they must be pressed to register a press, and software for remapping buttons.

In May 2018, Microsoft announced the Xbox Adaptive Controller—a special controller designed for users with disabilities. It features two large dome-like buttons, and a series of connectors corresponding to standard Xbox controller buttons—which are used to attach specific types of buttons and other assertive peripherals. The controller can also be used in conjunction with Copilot—a feature introduced in 2017 that allows multiple controllers to be used in tandem on behalf of a single player.

As of the November 2018 update, developers may now optionally allow their titles to support computer mice and keyboards as input. Microsoft also unveiled an exclusive partnership with Razer Inc. to produce a specific line of Xbox-optimized keyboard and mice peripherals, with Xbox system keys and support for Razer's Chroma LED lighting platform.

=== Kinect 2.0 sensor ===
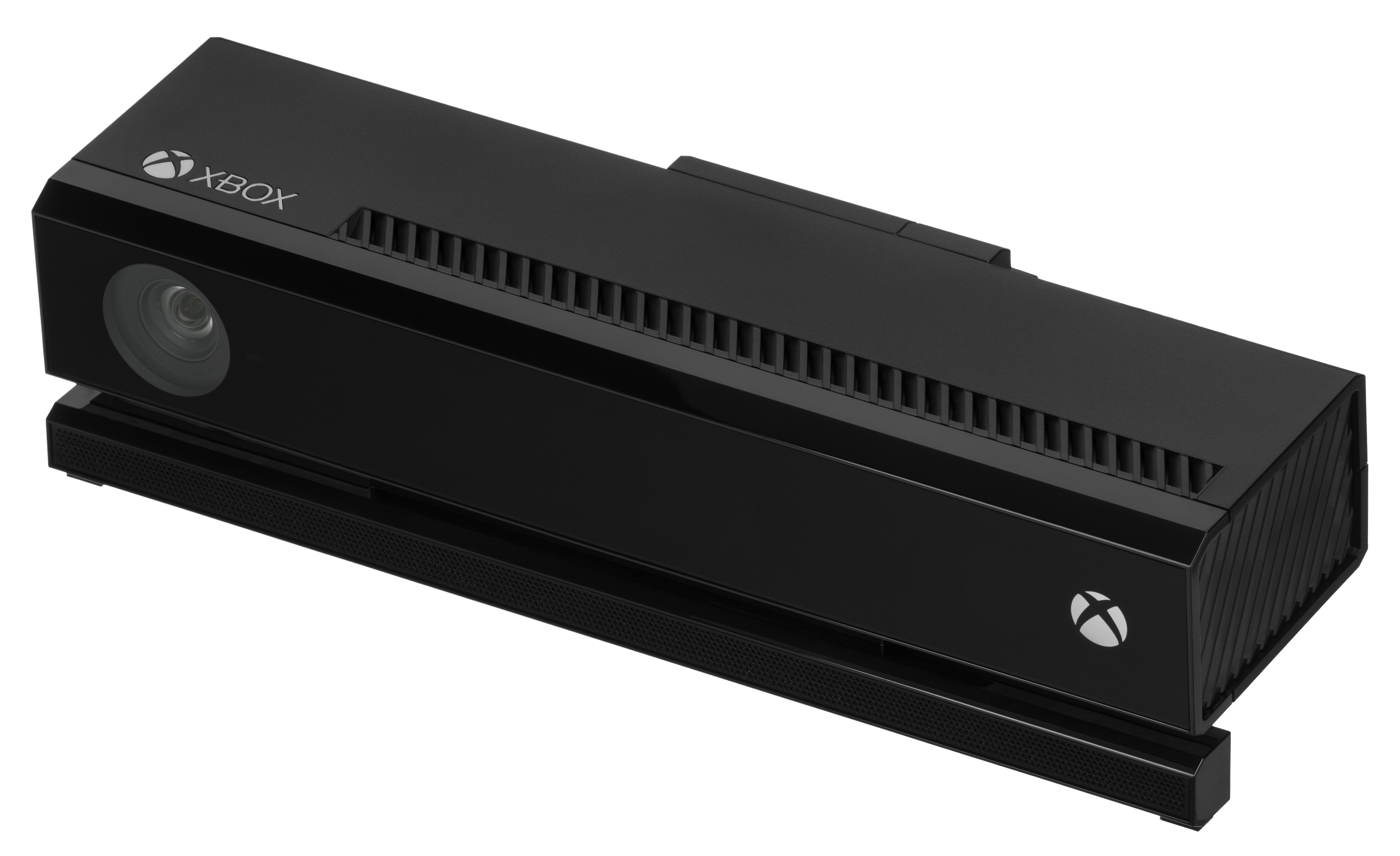
The Xbox One's upgraded Kinect is more accurate than its predecessor.

The Kinect 2.0, an updated natural user interface sensor, was redesigned and recreated to provide motion-tracking and voice commands for the Xbox One.

Kinect 2.0 features a wide-angle time-of-flight camera and a 1080p camera, in comparison to the VGA resolution of the Xbox 360 version, and processes 2 GB of data per second to map its environment. Kinect 2.0 has an improved accuracy over its predecessor; it can track up to 6 people simultaneously, referred to as "skeletons", perform heart rate tracking, track controller gestures, and read QR codes to redeem Xbox Live gift cards. By default, voice recognition is active at all times, so the console can receive voice commands from the user, even when the console is in sleep mode. It is possible to wake the console with a command, although settings are available to change which individual Kinect functions are active.

Prior to and after the mandate, all Xbox One consoles initially shipped with the Kinect sensor included. On June 9, 2014, cheaper Xbox One bundles were introduced, which did not include the Kinect sensor. Microsoft stated the decision to offer Xbox One bundles without Kinect was to "[offer] a choice to people that would allow people to buy an Xbox One and then ramp up to Kinect when they can afford to", while also allowing games to use processing power that was previously reserved for Kinect. An updated Xbox Development Kit issued in June 2014 allows developers to explicitly disable motion tracking functionality in games, allowing access to additional system resources that represent about 10% of the GPU processing power. These resources were previously reserved for Kinect skeletal tracking, regardless of whether the Kinect sensor was attached or in use.

A Windows compatible Kinect 2.0 was released on July 15, 2014. Kinect 2.0 was released as a standalone and optional item in October 2014; it is bundled with a digital copy of Dance Central Spotlight.

The Xbox One S lacks the Kinect connection port, requiring a USB/power adapter to use the accessory. A free USB adapter was provided by Microsoft to Kinect owners who registered their ownership of Kinect and Xbox One S online up until March 2017. The adapter was sold separately thereafter but has since been discontinued. Kinect for Xbox One was officially discontinued on October 25, 2017.

== Software and services ==
The Xbox One runs two operating systems within a hypervisor; games run within one separate operating system, while apps and the user interface run within a stripped-down version of Microsoft Windows; the original system software was based on Windows 8, but it has since been changed to Windows 10. This architecture allows resources to be allocated specifically to different aspects of the console's functions, including multitasking and Kinect processing, ensuring an "absolute guarantee of performance" for games. Xbox One supports Universal Windows Platform apps, which can be designed to run across Xbox One, Windows 10, and Windows 10 Mobile in synchronization with the Windows platform.

Xbox One's user interface uses Microsoft's Fluent Design System; previous iterations of the console's software used the Metro design language. The dashboard is divided into "Home", "Mixer", "Community", "Entertainment", and "Store" sections, with the "Home" page further divided into "blocks" that can display pinned games/apps, as well as other content. Pressing the Xbox Guide button opens a sidebar with access to common functions such as the friends list, apps, the user's party, and settings. Users can go back to the dashboard while using games or apps using either the Xbox button on their controller or a voice command; up to four apps can run (either actively or in the background) at once, but only one game can run at a time. Use of Kinect enables the ability to control the console via voice commands. Xbox One's voice control capabilities are similar to, albeit richer than those of Xbox 360. The voice assistant Cortana was added in 2016 to provide expanded voice command functionality with natural language recognition.

The dashboard originally used a layout similar to Windows 8's "Start screen", with a horizontal-scrolling, tile-based interface. This design was replaced for Xbox Preview Program members in September 2015 with the current interface, known as "the New Xbox One Experience", which was publicly released as part of the November 12, 2015, system update. Alongside its new layout, support for Kinect motion controls on the dashboard were removed.

The UI was refreshed again in April 2017, adding the new Guide sidebar and other new features. At this time, the ability to "snap" apps as a sidebar for multi-tasking was removed. The UI was further revamped in October 2017, adopting Windows 10's "Fluent" design language. and adds a light color option for the console's user interface.

In 2024, it was reported that original Xbox One models operating on firmware versions prior to 2019 were experiencing update failures, which led to the disablement of the majority of the console's functions due to mandatory online requirements. Microsoft fixed the issue shortly after. The issue raised concerns regarding the preservation status of the console and its game library.

=== Multimedia features ===
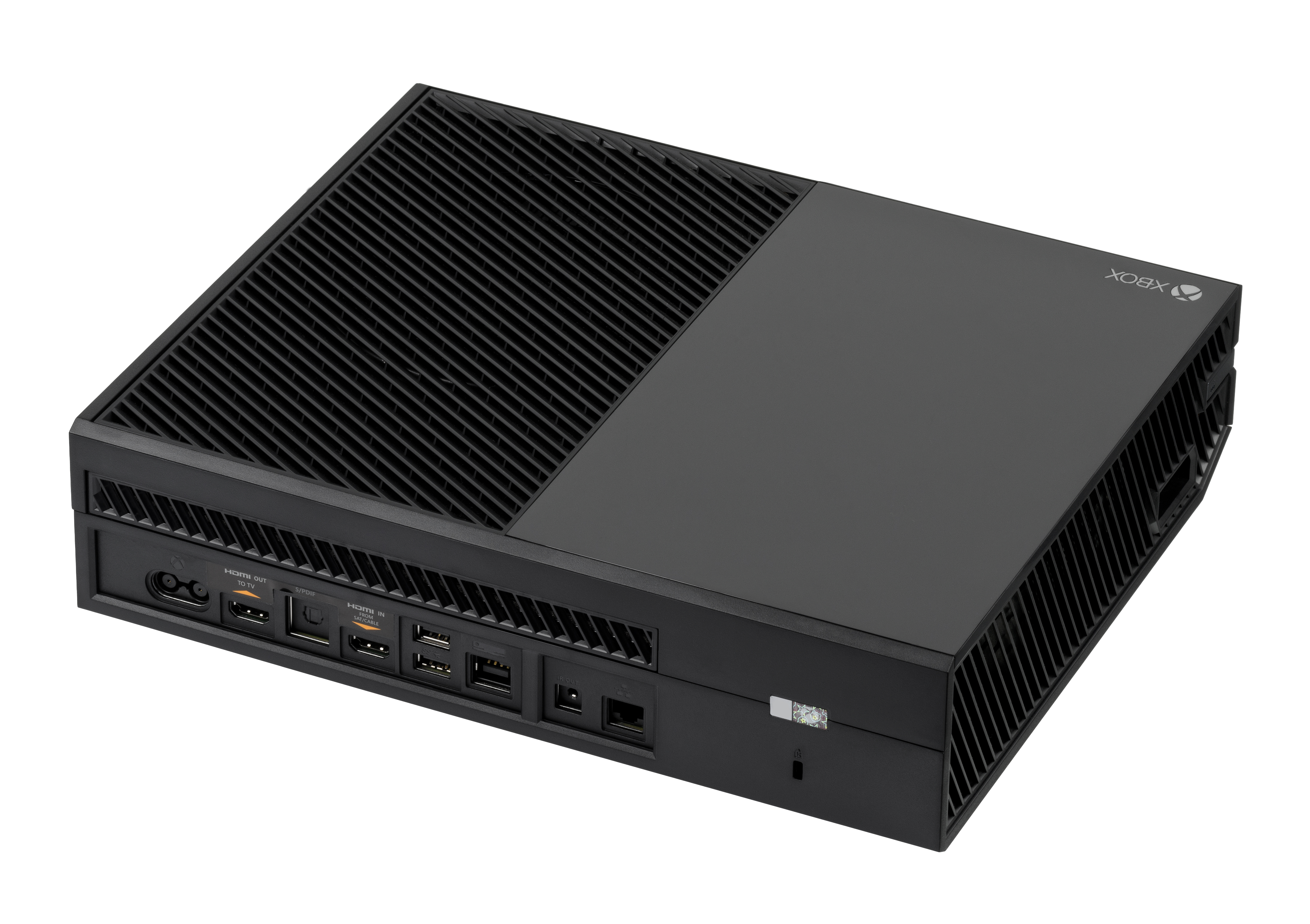
The Xbox One features an HDMI input that can be used as a pass-through for TV set-top boxes.

The Xbox One can view and play content from DLNA servers and USB storage devices using the "Media Player" app. An application allows playback of video from Blu-ray Disc, DVD and CD media.

The console provides the ability to feed live television by serving as an HDMI pass-through for an existing television provider's set-top box or an optional Digital TV Tuner accessory that allows use of digital terrestrial television. The console provided its own electronic program guide known as OneGuide, augmenting the existing streaming functionality to provide show recommendations based on viewing history, integrated access to "App Channels" corresponding to online video services, and voice control via Kinect. The set-top box and television were controlled by OneGuide using an IR blaster. OneGuide service was discontinued in May 2021.

The Xbox One does not provide full DVR functionality for recording television programs: executive Yusuf Mehdi indicated that the console would "work in tandem" with existing television services, but that Microsoft would need to work with them directly to provide extended functionality, such as DVR integration. The digital TV tuner accessory allows limited DVR functionality for pausing and rewinding live TV for up to 30 minutes.

=== Xbox Live ===
Xbox Live logo used from 2013 to 2021

The Xbox Live service has been scaled up to use 300,000 servers for Xbox One users. Cloud storage is available to save music, films, games and saved content, and developers are able to use Live servers (along with the Microsoft Azure cloud computing platform) to offer dynamic in-game content and other functionality. Users can have up to 1,000 friends. The December 2016 software update added the new social networking feature Clubs, which allows users to join groups focused on specific interests or games, and Looking for group (LFG), a system to help users locate players to join their party for multiplayer play.

Players can use the Upload Studio app to edit and share clips from the last five minutes of gameplay footage that is automatically recorded by the console. Games can also be developed so that recording can automatically be triggered in response to notable events, such as achievements. Xbox One supports streaming directly to the service Twitch. Users can use voice commands to immediately begin streaming footage of their current game directly to the service, and use Kinect's camera and microphone to record video and audio narration. Users can feature recorded clips on their Xbox Live profile page in a "Showcase" section. The console had also supported Mixer prior to its shutdown in July 2020.

As with Xbox 360, premium online features such as multiplayer, voice communication, broadcasting and Upload Studio require an Xbox Live Gold subscription to use. Unlike Xbox 360, a user's Xbox Live Gold subscription benefits apply to all other users of their designated "home" console as well, rather than requiring a separate subscription for each user. Since June 2014, applications no longer require an Xbox Live Gold membership to use. Additional subscriptions for outside services such as Netflix may still be required. Microsoft also extended its Games with Gold program to Xbox One, providing Xbox 360 and Xbox One games to Xbox Live Gold subscribers on a monthly basis.

=== Companion apps ===
The console can be additionally controlled using the Xbox app (formerly Xbox One SmartGlass), initially released at launch for Android, iOS, Windows 8.1, and Windows Phone 8, and currently available for Android, iOS, and Windows 10 and newer, the apps allows users to access Xbox social features such as messages and the Activity Feed, browse Microsoft Store, use the device as a remote control for navigation and text input, and access the Xbox Cloud Gaming service.

An updated Windows 10 version of the app's PC version introduced the ability to stream games from the console to PCs over a local network. An Xbox One controller must be used, but Windows-compatible headsets and microphones can be used for voice chat. Games requiring Kinect are not supported, while Game DVR and online streaming are not available while using this feature The feature later became available to the Xbox mobile apps as well, now known as "Remote Play".

== Games ==
Xbox One games are distributed physically on Blu-ray Disc, and digitally as downloads through Microsoft Store (formerly Xbox Games Store). All Xbox One games must be installed to the console's storage: one can begin to play portions of a game (such as opening levels) once the installation or download reaches a specific point, while the remainder of the game is downloaded or installed in the background. However, for older titles (such as Xbox 360 games, see "Xbox 360 compatibility", below), one must wait until installation is completed to play.

Updates to games and system software are also downloaded in the background and while in standby. If the game is installed from physical media, the disc is still required for validation purposes. If the game is installed on another console, and that console owner no longer has access to the disc, the owner has the option of unlocking the install on their hard drive by purchasing it through Xbox Live; the installed game then acts as a game installed on the hard drive. An active internet connection may be required for some games, particularly those that rely on server-side processing.

Microsoft introduced an Early access program known as Xbox Game Preview in 2015, which allows developers to launch unfinished games for consumers to purchase and beta test before its official launch. Since June 2017, games may be promoted with additional icons that denote compatibility with hardware enhancements found in newer Xbox One models, including support for high-dynamic-range (HDR) colors (on Xbox One S and Xbox One X), native rendering at 4K resolution (Xbox One X), and specific optimizations for Xbox One X.

In 2016, Microsoft began to make future Xbox One-exclusive first-party releases simultaneously available on Windows 10 PCs, with digital cross-buy support via Microsoft Store under the branding Xbox Play Anywhere. This, thus, makes the games Microsoft platform exclusives rather than Xbox One exclusives. Microsoft has used the branding "console launch exclusive" to refer to titles (such as PlayerUnknown's Battlegrounds) that are timed or permanent exclusives to Xbox console hardware, but were already available on, or are planned to be available on PC.

In February 2017, Microsoft introduced an "on-demand" subscription service known as Xbox Game Pass, separate from Xbox Live Gold, which allows users to download and play games from its library for the life of the subscription. In April 2019, Microsoft also introduced Xbox Game Pass Ultimate, which bundles Game Pass with an Xbox Live Gold subscription.

=== Backward compatibility ===
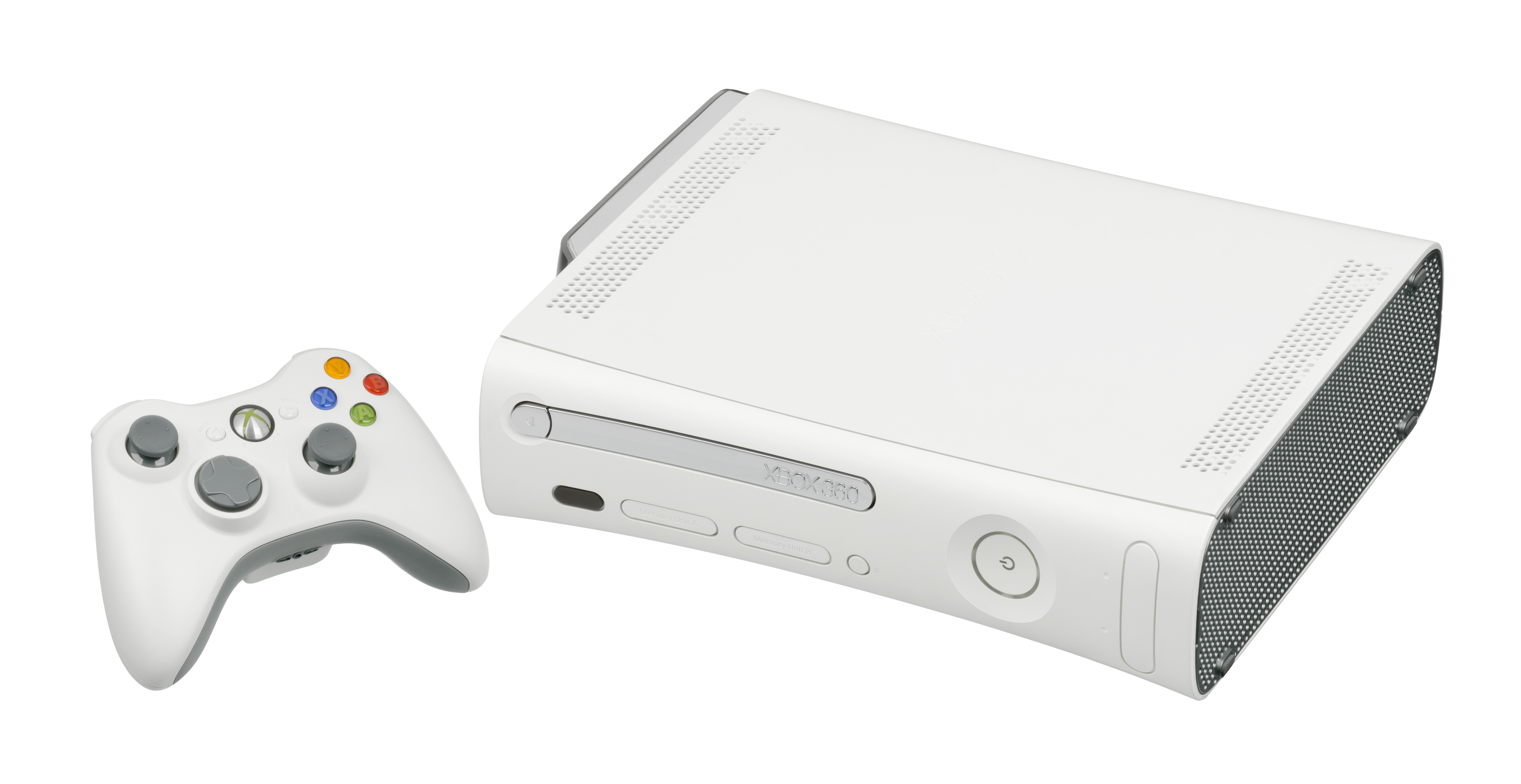
The Xbox One achieves backward compatibility with select Xbox 360 games through software emulation.

==== Xbox 360 compatibility ====
"Absolutely; you can certainly plug an Xbox 360 in the back – that was one of my first questions when I heard about the [HDMI-in] feature,"

— Larry Hryb, Xbox Live Director of programming

At its launch, the Xbox One did not have native backward compatibility with original Xbox or Xbox 360 games, and at the time Microsoft stated it had no plans for any form of backward compatibility on the console. Don Mattrick, head of the company's Interactive Entertainment Business at the time, said in an interview that he didn't see backward compatibility as a problem and stated that "If you're backwards compatible, you're backwards". According to Mattrick, investing in backward compatibility wasn't worth the company's time and resources, as only 5% of Microsoft's customers played older games on new video game consoles.

However, backward compatibility had been a planned launch feature by Microsoft and had been actively under development as early as 2007 under the "Trioxide" program to get Xbox 360 code to run on 64-bit hardware. Rather than going the route of the initial PlayStation 3 which included a core PlayStation 2 system-on-a-chip processor, the Xbox One hardware was designed to include support for Xbox 360 XMA and texture processing in hardware, knowing this would be computationally expensive and inefficient to replicate in software. Following criticism of its plan for an "always on" console from the May 2013 announcement, Microsoft had to put significant effort to prepare the Xbox One software for a revised approach, and the backward compatibility development work was put on hold. Interim solutions were suggested: senior project management and planning director Albert Penello explained that Microsoft was initially considering a cloud gaming platform to enable backward compatibility, but he felt it would be "problematic" due to varying internet connection qualities. Xbox Live director of programming Larry "Major Nelson" Hryb did state that users could theoretically use the HDMI-in port on the console to pass an Xbox 360 (or, alternatively, any other device that supports HDMI output, including competing consoles) through the Xbox One. This process does generate a small amount of unnoticeable display lag.

Following the release of the Xbox One and transition of Phil Spencer to the head of the Xbox division in 2014, he and software engineering vice president Kareem Choudhry restarted the backward compatibility program in relative secret within the company. Choudhry brought on previous engineers that worked on Trioxide, including Kevin La Chapelle, Jonathan Morrison, and Barry Bond, to restart the program. The team chose to start with Castle Crashers, which included Xbox networking features, to test backward compatibility. Castle Crashers frequently crashed to a screen with alphanumeric codes, which La Chapelle was able to obtain from the game's developers, The Behemoth, which helped them to rapidly diagnose problems and fix the compatibility issues. Solving most of the major problems through Castle Crashers, the background compatibility team decided to let the program be announced at E3 2015 with plans to have one hundred titles available by the end of 2015. However, by E3, they still found problems with some games running at extremely low framerates. During the event, Morrison recognized that a fundamental difference between the Xbox 360 and Xbox One was its scheduling rate, and when they returned, Morrison's idea helped them to rapidly complete work to meet its promised goal by the end of that year. Individual games still brought some difficulty, specifically Halo: Reach, but this prompted the team to develop automatic tools that could be used to identify where Xbox 360 titles would be difficult to run as-is on the Xbox One and how to work around those; this further set up the potential to improve Xbox 360 games on the future iterations of the Xbox One, such as the Xbox One X to improve graphics support.

Xbox 360 backward compatibility uses "Fission", a software emulator within the system software; 104 Xbox 360 titles were supported at the feature's public launch, with more added in the following months. Xbox 360 games contained within Rare Replay are packaged as standalone applications using the Xbox 360 emulation. Microsoft stated that publishers would only need to provide permission to the company to allow the repackaging, and it expected the number of supported games to increase significantly over time. Microsoft, along with fourteen other third-party publishers, will offer supported games, and all Games with Gold titles on Xbox 360 since November 2015 are made compatible.

On June 10, 2019, Microsoft stated that it had wound down the addition of new titles to the backward compatibility program in order to focus on Xbox One's successor, the Xbox Series X/S console, which was released in November 2020. Microsoft announced one last set of additions to the backward compatibility program on November 15, 2021, as part of their 20th anniversary of the Xbox, adding 76 titles new to the program. However, Microsoft anticipated this will be the last set of backward compatible titles they can add, as they "have reached the limit of our ability to bring new games to the catalog from the past due to licensing, legal and technical constraints".

All Xbox 360 and original Xbox games that are supported by backward compatibility on the Xbox One are also supported on the Xbox Series X/S. In addition, these games include automatic high-dynamic-range rendering (HDR) and resolution increases, depending on the original game and current platform. Select games have also been enabled with FPS Boost that increases the rendering rate up to 60 frames per second.

==== Original Xbox compatibility ====
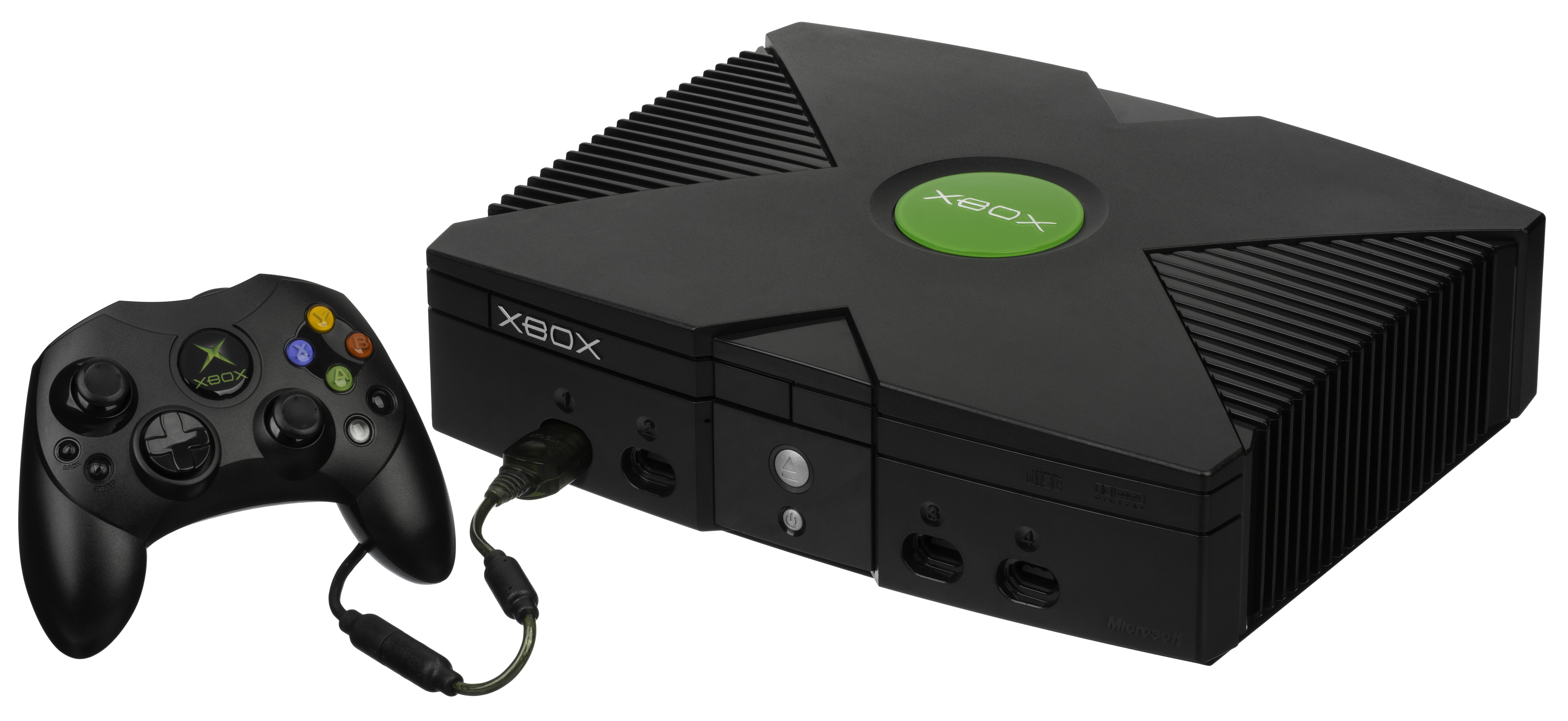
The first Xbox video game revealed to be compatible with the Xbox One was Crimson Skies: High Road to Revenge.

Xbox division head Phil Spencer had also hinted the possibility of adding support for games from the original Xbox. For the backward compatibility team, after they completed the framework for Xbox 360 compatibility so that other engineering teams could take over, they turned to the question of compatibility with the original Xbox console. The program was started in November 2016, under the code name "Fusion", and was led by software engineer Spencer Perreault. Perreault initially tried the same approaches as the team had done with "Fission", but due to the differences in memory management sizes and chipset bit-rates, these initial tests failed. Instead, Perreault worked to bring "Dolphin", a developer tool for the original Xbox, working to get its emulation correct. La Chapelle brought in a number of personal Xbox titles to test in Perreault's emulation, getting about a 10% "hit rate" on successes, though the variety of failures helped Perreault to identify common problems, and within a month, had improved the successful hit rate to about 90%. As with Xbox 360 backward compatibility, the Fusion emulation enables Xbox games to be scaled to 1080p resolutions, work with Xbox One networking features, and can allow mixed-console System Link connection between all three generations of Xbox.

With Perreault's success, Microsoft announced the Xbox backward compatibility on the Xbox One in June 2017. Thirteen titles were initially released on October 24, 2017. Microsoft announced an additional 19 titles to be added to the Xbox One service during April 2018.

Microsoft does not anticipate that there will be as many Xbox titles brought to the program as with the Xbox 360, primarily due to legal issues related to intellectual property, contracts, and companies that have since gone defunct.

== Reception ==
=== Pre-release ===
While the initial unveiling of the Xbox One in May 2013 created criticism that led to significant changes in the digital rights management scheme it would use, other features of the console were highlighted by journalists. The editorial staff of Game Informer offered both praise and criticism for the console. Matt Helgeson described the console as Microsoft's intent to "control the living room". He called Xbox One's instant switching features "impressive", and that the console was "a step in the right direction" with regards to TV entertainment, especially the prospect of avoiding the usage of non-intuitive user interfaces often found on cable set-top boxes. Jeff Cork said that Microsoft had "some great ideas" for the console, but that it failed to properly communicate them.

Microsoft's E3 2013 press conference was criticized for focusing too much on games that, beyond increased graphical capabilities, provided experiences that were otherwise similar to previous-generation games—giving little incentive for buying the new console. Rafi Mohammed, author of The Art of Pricing, felt that Microsoft priced Xbox One "too high" and that the $100 premium over its competitor could "derail" the system during the 2013 holiday season.

=== Critical reception ===
Upon its release, the Xbox One received favorable reviews from critics and reviewers. In its launch review, Polygon gave the Xbox One a score of 8/10. Its design was described as "inoffensive" but its larger size noted, while the console's quieter and cooler operation was praised for indicating a potentially higher reliability than Xbox 360 was on-launch. The controller was praised for its battery life and "premium" design, but some members of the site's staff felt that its shoulder buttons were stiffer than that of previous designs. The design of Xbox One's interface received mixed reviews: noting that it carried over Windows 8's design language, the interface was disfavored for hiding functions under the controller's menu button and for being awkward to use with a controller or motion gestures, seemingly encouraging users to use voice navigation instead. While praised for having more "robust" voice navigation than Xbox 360, they felt that voice navigation still had a "learning curve in understanding what works and what doesn't." Although its user following, Smart Match, and improved voice chat features were noted, Xbox Live was panned for not offering the option on-launch to add a real name to user profiles. Despite a regression in local and network multimedia functionality in comparison to Xbox 360 and how OneGuide interacted with outside set-top boxes (drawing comparisons to the operations of TiVo DVRs), Polygon felt the Xbox One's overall multimedia experience "feels like a major step forward in set-top boxes and makes the Xbox One the obvious center of any living room that has one."

Ben Gilbert of Engadget was similarly modest upon its launch, assigning the console a score of 81/100 and describing the Xbox One's design as a "1993 artist's rendering of 2013's technology". Acknowledging that its controller was a mere refinement of the "ubiquit[ous]" Xbox 360 design, he praised the controller for its improved D-pad and quieter triggers but criticized its stiff shoulder buttons. Kinect received positive reviews for its face recognition login and improved motion tracking, but that whilst "magical", "every false positive or unrecognized [voice] command had us reaching for the controller." The overall interface was also considered more intuitive and flexible than that of PlayStation 4, but its game library view was described as being a "jumbled, sadly unfilterable rows of every owned piece of software", that also knowingly listed games that require their disc to run alongside those which did not. The console was also panned for missing certain promised features on-launch, such as Upload Studio, game streaming, and certain apps/services.

Later on, critics felt that the Xbox One's functionality had matured over the year following its launch; Jeff Bakalar of CNET, assigning it a score of 8/10, acknowledged improvements to Xbox One's software since its original release, but that its user interface was still unintuitive in comparison to Xbox 360 and PlayStation 4, explaining that "navigating the interface seems to be much more problematic than it rightfully should be, and there's simply not enough transparency in the logic within it. There are oddities peppered throughout, which is the root for countless headaches and frustrations." Xbox One's in-game performance was mixed, with some titles showing slower performance over PS4, but some multi-platform games performing better on Xbox One than PS4. CNET praised the wider lineup of multimedia services and apps on Xbox One over PS4, not requiring Xbox Live Gold for online save data storage, support for high-speed USB 3.0 as secondary storage, and having a "slightly better" lineup of upcoming exclusives, concluding that "While the PS4 had a clear advantage at launch, that edge is slowly evaporating as Microsoft has worked feverishly to undo most of the Xbox One's original missteps."

Nick Pino of TechRadar, giving it four stars out of five, similarly felt that the Xbox One "[felt] more like a media titan today than it did 12 months ago," citing OneGuide, Upload Studio, and Microsoft's decision to drop the Xbox Live Gold requirement for multimedia streaming apps, and that "there's still a lot of potential locked away inside the hardware of the system that developers are just beginning to figure out. So while PlayStation might have the upper hand for now when it comes to certain third-party titles, it may not always remain that way. Just how Microsoft will get it to that point, though, is still a mystery." However, he disfavored the console's dependence upon a subscription for most of its functionality, Kinect's voice recognition, and that some games do not natively run at 1080p resolution, but are upscaled. In an August 2016 review of the Xbox One S model, TechRadar further commended Microsoft's recent improvements to Xbox One, citing a strong lineup of first-party titles in 2015 and further improvements to the console's interface.

Alaina Yee of IGN also praised how Xbox One had evolved since its launch, assigning it with Kinect a score of 8.1/10 and acknowledging that Microsoft had "made good on its promise of listening to consumers, rolling out a steady stream of updates that have both broadened and deepened what this third Xbox console offers." Regarding the console's slightly lower level of graphics capabilities in comparison to PlayStation 4, it was noted that "while videophiles might spot instances of upscaled graphics and less detailed environments immediately, most people generally won't notice a difference between Xbox One and PlayStation 4 versions of a game (when there is one) unless they see both running side by side", and examples of "gorgeous" Xbox One games were noted, such as Sunset Overdrive and Forza Motorsport 5. The number of "hidden" options in Xbox One's user interface was equated to "hunting for treasure in a messy room"; as such, Kinect voice commands, in combination with access to common functions within the Xbox SmartGlass app, were praised for helping to provide a more streamlined user experience.

The Xbox One S revision was critically praised for its improvements over the original model, including its streamlined design, the addition of HDR and 4K video support, and visual improvements on some games (such as Fallout 4 and Rise of the Tomb Raider) when upscaled to 4K. However, TechRadar noted regressions such as the lack of a Kinect port (considered "one last kick in the pants for all the gamers forced into buying the more expensive console bundle two short years ago"), and concerns that the revised hardware and HDR support would lead to fragmentation of Xbox One's ecosystem, as not all users will necessarily experience a game the same way.

Dieter Bohn of The Verge similarly felt that although it was one of the cheapest 4K Blu-ray players on the market, consumers were more interested in streaming 4K content (which could be accomplished with cheaper digital media players) than 4K Blu-ray discs, and noted the small number of HDR-enabled games on launch. Bohn concluded that the Xbox One S would appeal best to new owners or those who wish to leverage its HDR and 4K support but recommended that existing owners consider Xbox One X instead.

=== Game library ===
==== Lack of exclusive titles ====
The Xbox One platform has faced criticism for lacking in exclusive releases over competitors such as PlayStation 4 and Nintendo Switch. Although there have been releases in flagship Microsoft franchises such as Halo and Gears of War, they have underperformed in comparison to other entries, while several major Xbox One exclusives have faced notable delays, such as Crackdown 3, or outright cancellations, including Fable Legends and Scalebound. By contrast, the other consoles of the eighth generation, the PlayStation 4 and the Nintendo Switch, have seen a large number of critically successful first- and third-party exclusives. Further, Activision signed with Sony Interactive Entertainment for timed exclusivity on certain add-on content in the Call of Duty and Destiny franchises, the former having replaced a previous deal with Microsoft. Chaim Gartenberg of The Verge opined that "without unique games, the Xbox One is a slightly less powerful, definitely less popular PlayStation 4", while Rob Fahey of GamesIndustry.biz questioned whether the lack of Xbox exclusives was a sign of a "worrying trend" for the future of the platform. An analyst also noted that Microsoft's first-party studios were not as strong as those of Sony, explaining that "Sony has always been about first party and Microsoft wanted to emulate that, but they allowed studios like Rare and Lionhead to fade away."

Microsoft began a realignment of its first party studios then named Microsoft Studios starting around 2017. The collection of studios was rebranded as Xbox Game Studios in February 2019, with a strong aim to provide exclusive games for the Xbox console family from these studios. Besides a change in leadership, with Phil Spencer promoted to Microsoft's executive vice-president of gaming and Matty Booty as executive vice-president of Xbox Game Studios, Microsoft made a number of key acquisitions from 2018 to 2020, including Compulsion Games, InXile Entertainment, Ninja Theory, Obsidian Entertainment, Playground Games, Undead Labs, and Double Fine, as well as creating internal studios to manage its gaming IP, such as The Initiative and World's Edge. Microsoft also acquired ZeniMax Media and its host of studios, including Bethesda Game Studios, id Software, Arkane Studios, MachineGames, and Tango Gameworks, in March 2021 for $7.5 billion, with the intent of providing exclusive content for its Xbox Game Pass service for the Xbox family and Windows personal computers.

==== Kinect games ====
In addition to the pre-launch controversy over the required use of the Kinect device, the games that launched with the Xbox One that supported the Kinect were seen by critics as lackluster, and the only Kinect-exclusive game at launch, Fighter Within, was one of the system's worst-reviewed games. Fewer developers incorporated Kinect into their Xbox One games compared to the Xbox 360 version, and by June 2014, Microsoft made the decision to de-bundle Kinect from the Xbox One, and by 2017, discontinued the Kinect hardware for the Xbox product family, though Microsoft continued to expand Kinect for commercial and research applications.

==== Indie games policy ====
Microsoft initially imposed policies referred to as the "parity clause" on indie games, which required that the Xbox One version of a game be released at the same time as versions on other platforms. Phil Spencer stated that this rule was intended to ensure that Xbox One was a "first-class" platform by discouraging staggered releases. However, these policies resulted in some studios, such as Vlambeer (developer of Nuclear Throne) choosing to negotiate console exclusivity with Sony instead, who proved to be more receptive to indie development. By July 2015, Microsoft had changed its policies in response to the criticism, with Spencer admitting that this policy was onerous on smaller studios. Spencer also stated that Microsoft was willing to work with studios to help make the Xbox launches of former timed exclusives "special in some way", so that customers are not simply purchasing "last year's game".

=== Sales ===
Microsoft only publicized its sales figures during the first year after release. The last official figures were 3 million sold as of December 2013, and approximately 10 million shipped as of November 2014. In October 2015 Microsoft announced that it would no longer publish sales figures for any of their systems.

On November 22, 2013, Microsoft confirmed that it had sold one million Xbox One consoles within its first 24 hours of being available. That figure rose to about 2 million units after 18 days of sale, and to 3 million units by the end of 2013. In their Q2 2014 earnings report on January 23, 2014, Microsoft announced that 3.9 million Xbox One units had been shipped worldwide. On April 17, 2014, Microsoft announced it had shipped 5 million consoles to retailers worldwide, with that figure rising to almost 10 million on November 12, 2014. The company also revealed that a price cut had tripled U.S. sales of the console over the previous week. In October 2015, Microsoft announced that it would no longer publish sales figures for the system, instead focusing on Xbox Live engagement figures. The last official cumulative sales figure is from November 2014, at 10 million units sold. GamesIndustry.biz's Brendan Sinclair speculated that this decision was to draw attention away from the lower sales figures of the Xbox One compared to the PlayStation 4, and estimated Xbox One sales to be around 18 million at the time.

In January 2016, CFO of Electronic Arts Blake Jorgensen reported during a financial call that the Xbox One had sold "around 18 to 19 million" units. This is half of the 36 million units of the PlayStation 4 that Sony claimed at the time, but higher than that of the Xbox One's other main competitor, Nintendo's Wii U, which sold 12.5 million units. Research firm IHS Markit estimated 39.1 million units were sold by the end of March 2018. Video game industry analyst Daniel Ahmad estimated that approximately 41 million units had been as of January 2019. Most industry analysts have estimated Xbox One's lifetime sales to be around 50 million to 51 million units.

In an August 2022 antitrust filing with Brazilian regulator Cade regarding its proposed acquisition of Activision Blizzard, Microsoft stated that "more than twice as many" PlayStation 4 consoles were sold in comparison to Xbox consoles during the previous generation. Based on figures from Sony stating that 117.2 million PS4 consoles had been shipped as of March 2022, it was projected by The Verge that the Xbox One must have sold less than 58.5 million units, and that these numbers were in line with market research from Ampere Analysis which found that Xbox One had an install base of 51 million consoles as of Q2 2020.

In June 2023, during an ID@Xbox presentation at the Best International Games (BIG) Festival in Brazil, Microsoft revealed that 58+ million Xbox One consoles have been shipped worldwide.

Continental Europe

By the end of 2013, 126,201 Xbox One consoles had been sold in France, according to GfK. In 2015, 298,000 Xbox One consoles were sold in France, and total sales reached 715,000 units in the country. The 1 million unit sold would be crossed by early 2017. In 2015, 270,000 Xbox One consoles were sold in Germany, bringing total sales to 600,000 units. Xbox One launch week sales were around 15,000 units in Spain, roughly equivalent to the Xbox 360's launch week. Xbox One sales reached 428,000 units by the end of 2016, and topped 500,000 units by the end of 2017. 24,500 Xbox One consoles were sold in Spain in 2020.

Japan

The Xbox One has sold poorly in Japan. Microsoft's consoles have historically struggled to gain significant market share in the country. The Xbox One sold a total figure of 23,562 consoles within its launch week in September 2014, which is down compared to the Xbox 360's opening week sales of 62,000 consoles in December 2005. Its best-selling titles were Titanfall at 22,416 units, Kinect Sports Rivals at 14,191 units, and Dead Rising 3 at 7,330 units. In the week ending June 14, 2015, the Xbox One sold just 100 consoles in Japan; in the same week the Wii U sold 16,413 consoles.

According to the International Data Corporation, only 0.3% of the 46.9 million Xbox Ones sold worldwide through the second quarter of 2019 have been from Japan. As of December 2020, shortly after the release of Xbox Series X and Series S, Xbox One sales in Japan were estimated to be around 115,000 units according to Famitsu. Matsui Munetatsu from Famitsu attributes the poor performance of the Xbox One as being the result of launching the console months after the global launch and the competition, the lack of titles specifically suited to Japanese gamers and the minimal effort made on localizing games in the Japanese language.

United Kingdom

The Xbox One was successful in the UK. Xbox One launch week sales were around 150,000 units, double that of the Xbox 360. Microsoft enacted a UK-only price cut in February 2014 to bring the console's price closer to that of the PlayStation 4, which had released at a more affordable price. The Xbox One was the best-selling console in November 2014. The Xbox One took 104 weeks to reach the 2 million units sold in the UK, generating £726m in revenue.

The launch of the revised Xbox One S and Xbox One X models, in August 2016 and November 2017, respectively, greatly improved sales of the system in the region. Following the release of the Xbox One S, Xbox One sales were up 989% on a week-to-week basis. This boost in sales caused the Xbox One to be the best-selling console for two months in a row for the first time in the UK, in September and October 2016, with 99,496 units sold during the latter month. First-week sales of the Xbox One X in November 2017 reached 80,000 units. Total Xbox One sales were approaching 5 million units near the end of 2018.

During the week of Black Friday 2019, Xbox One was the best-selling console with over 100,000 units sold. Total sales in the UK were 500,000 units in 2019, and 290,000 units in 2020.

United States

Demand for the Xbox One was strong in the US. The US is sometimes referred by pundits as a "traditional Xbox market" alongside the UK and Australia, which are regions where Xbox systems tend to do particularly well. Microsoft announced that the Xbox One had sold 909,132 units in November 2013, based on only nine days of sales. The Xbox One launch in November 2013 was nearly three times that of the Xbox 360 launch in November 2005. An average of 2.1 games per console were sold. Based on approximately 102,000 shopping receipts tracked by InfoScout, 1,500 of which included a purchase of either a video game or a video game console, the Xbox One was the highest-selling console during the Black Friday 2013 sales period in the United States. Xbox One was the best-selling console in December 2013, selling 908,000 units.

258,000 Xbox One consoles were sold in the US in the month of February 2014. In March 2014, hardware and software sales rose to 311,000 consoles and 1.4 million games sold, respectively. 115,000 Xbox One consoles were sold in April 2014. In June 2014, following the introduction of an Xbox One bundle without the Kinect priced at $400, sales of the Xbox One more than doubled that of the previous month. Xbox One was the best-selling console in the country in November and December 2014, in April and October 2015, and from July to October 2016. During the month of November 2018, over 1.3 million Xbox One consoles were sold in the US.

== Retail configurations ==
=== Launch configuration ===
On launch, Xbox One was available in a single retail configuration, which included the console with 500 GB hard drive, one controller, and Kinect sensor. In the United States, it retailed for US$499. On June 9, 2014, Microsoft released a new Xbox One retail configuration that excludes the Kinect sensor, costing US$399. A standalone Kinect sensor for Xbox One for use with these models was released in October 2014, retailing at US$150. On June 16, 2015, Microsoft lowered the price of the stock model to US$349, and released a new US$399 model containing a 1 terabyte hard drive and in some markets, Halo: The Master Chief Collection. In May 2016, Microsoft lowered the price of selected 500 GB bundles to US$299, and 1 TB bundles to US$319 as a limited time offer of unspecified length. On June 14, 2016, the price of 500 GB models was lowered once more to US$279 through October 2016, in anticipation of the launch of Xbox One S.

On August 31, 2015, Microsoft announced Xbox One Elite—a new SKU with a 1 TB solid-state hybrid drive and an Elite controller. It was released in November 2015 and retails for US$499.99. In the US, the Elite bundle was a timed exclusive to GameStop and Microsoft Store.

The launch hardware configuration's production was discontinued by mid-2016. A spokesperson for Microsoft told Rolling Stone, "we stopped manufacturing the original Xbox One when we introduced Xbox One S."

Its launch price in the United Kingdom was £429, A$599 in Australia, JP¥49,980 in Japan. It also launched in China in July 2014, for CN¥3,699.

==== Special editions ====
Those who pre-ordered Xbox One for its release received a special "Day One Edition", which featured a "DAY ONE 2013" inscriptions on the controller, and a unique achievement. A white "Launch Team" edition was given exclusively to Microsoft staff members, featuring the inscription "I made this, LAUNCH TEAM 2013" on the console and controller, and was bundled with Dead Rising 3, Forza Motorsport 5, Ryse: Son of Rome, and Zoo Tycoon. A similar limited edition was gifted to Respawn Entertainment employees following the release of Titanfall, with a black, white, and orange color scheme and a similarly styled controller inspired by the game (the controller itself would be released publicly as a tie-in).

Xbox One consoles bundled with digital copies of specific games have also been released, including Titanfall and Forza Motorsport 5.

- In October 2014, a non-Kinect bundle featuring a white Xbox One and a coupon for a digital copy of Sunset Overdrive was released, marking the first public availability of white Xbox One models. A similar white hardware bundle was released for Quantum Break.
- In November 2014, a limited edition 1 TB bundle was released for Call of Duty: Advanced Warfare, with a "worn", militaristic grey and black color scheme with gold accents and insignia detailing (including the emblem of the Sentinel Task Force), customized hardware sound effects for the power and eject buttons, and a matching controller. It is bundled with a coupon for a digital copy of Advanced Warfare's "Day Zero" edition, which offered the pre-order incentives of pre-release access and special in-game items.
- 500 GB Assassin's Creed bundles were released in November 2014, which shipped with coupons for digital copies of both Assassin's Creed Unity and Assassin's Creed IV: Black Flag. This bundle was available with and without Kinect, with the Kinect version also including a coupon for a digital copy of Dance Central Spotlight.
- Another non-Kinect bundle was released in March 2015 that includes a coupon for a digital copy of Halo: The Master Chief Collection.
- A 1 TB Forza Motorsport 6 bundle was released on September 15, 2015, which features blue-colored hardware with racing stripes and a push-button start-inspired design around the power button, and customized hardware sound effects.
- A limited-edition 1 TB Halo 5: Guardians bundle was released on October 20, 2015 (one week before the launch of the game itself), and features a gunmetal gray finish with metallic blue accents, military insignia detailing, and customized hardware sound effects.
- A limited-edition 2 TB Gears of War 4 Xbox One S bundle was released in October 2016. The console is crimson red and features laser-etched scratches, the Crimson Omen emblem from the Gears of War franchise, and customized hardware sound effects.
- A limited-edition 1 TB Minecraft-themed Xbox One S with a custom design based on the game's distinctive grass blocks and Creeper Xbox controller was made available Holiday 2017.
- To celebrate the launch of the Xbox One X, a limited-edition 1 TB Xbox One X Project Scorpio edition was made available on November 7, 2017. The words "Project Scorpio" are emblazoned in green on both the controller and the console.
- A limited-edition 1 TB Xbox One S Fortnite bundle was released in June 2019. The console has a royal purple gradient color, and the controller is also stylized with purple.
- Microsoft released two limited-edition 1 TB Xbox One X bundles in September 2019, one for NBA 2K20 and one for Gears 5.
- The final limited-edition Xbox One released was the 1 TB Cyberpunk 2077 Xbox One X bundle, made available in June 2020. It features a cybernetic design, glowing elements, bright panels and color shift effects.

=== Xbox All-Access ===
In August 2018, Microsoft announced that it would, for a limited time, offer a financing program known as Xbox All Access through Microsoft Store in the United States. The program will allow users to purchase an Xbox One S or X console, bundled with subscriptions to both Xbox Live Gold and Xbox Game Pass, financed over a two-year contract. The customer retains ownership of the console after the two years, and if they break the contract prior to that, they must pay the difference on the remaining console cost. The pricing is set to be cheaper overall than purchasing the individual elements alone.

== Hardware revisions ==
=== Xbox One S ===
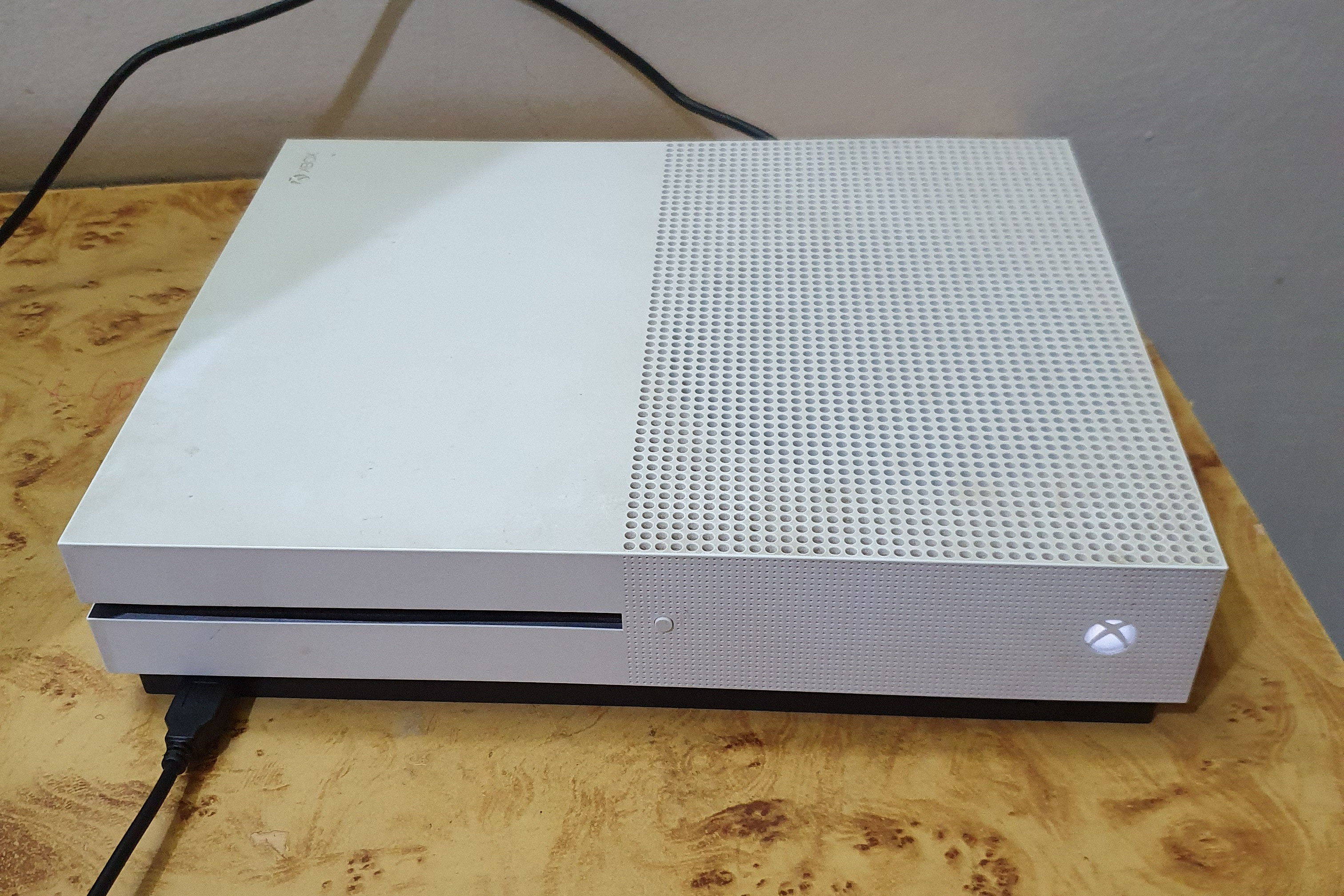
A white Xbox One S

The Xbox One S is available in 500 GB, 1 TB, and a "special edition" 2 TB model, which originally retailed at US$299, $349, and $399 respectively. The 2 TB model was released on August 2, 2016, and 1 TB and 500 GB models were released on August 23, 2016. A Gears of War 4 special edition was also released. On June 11, 2017, Microsoft lowered the prices of the 500 GB Battlefield 1 and 1 TB Forza Horizon 3 Xbox One S console bundles by US$50. At Gamescom 2017, Microsoft unveiled a 1 TB Minecraft limited edition, with a grass block-themed hardware and a Creeper-themed controller. During an Inside Xbox livestream in September 2018, Microsoft unveiled a 1 TB Fortnite Battle Royale bundle, with online codes to acquire unique in-game Eon-themed items and currency. On October 9, 2018, Microsoft announced that they would be releasing a 1 TB Minecraft Creators bundle, with a download code for Minecraft, in-game currency, DLC packs, and a free trial for Xbox Game Pass and Xbox Live Gold. On June 7, 2019, Microsoft released a second Fortnite bundle with purple hardware, as well as in-game currency and items. On March 17, 2020, a similar Roblox bundle was released, bundled with in-game items and currency, and a one-month trial of Xbox Game Pass Ultimate. The Xbox One S was quietly discontinued by the end of 2020.

==== Xbox One S All-Digital Edition ====
On April 16, 2019, Microsoft unveiled a configuration of the Xbox One S named Xbox One S All-Digital Edition, which does not include the Blu-ray Disc drive. It is a 1 TB model sold at a price of US$249, and includes digital download cards for Forza Horizon 3, Minecraft, and Sea of Thieves. The console was released on May 7, 2019. The unit was discontinued in July 2020.

=== Xbox One X ===
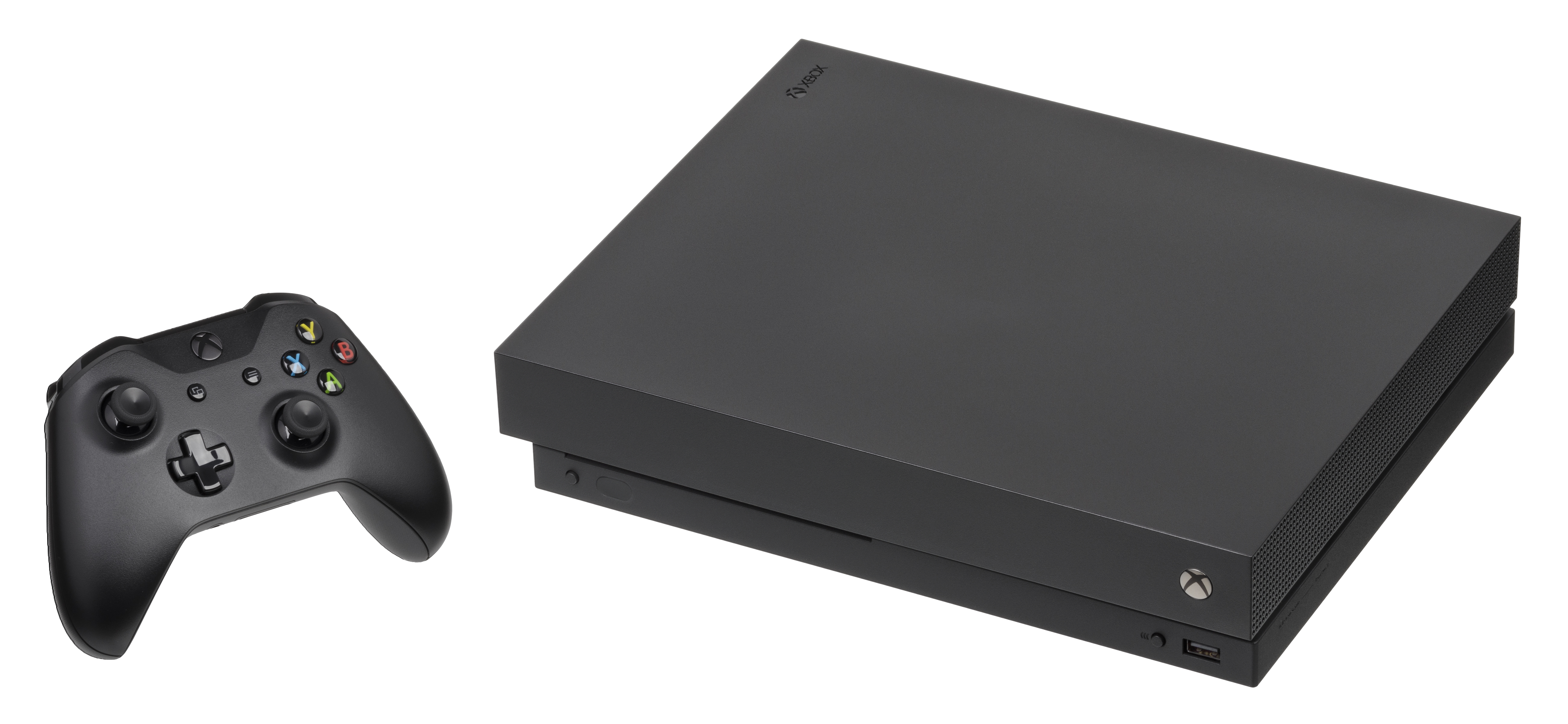
An Xbox One X

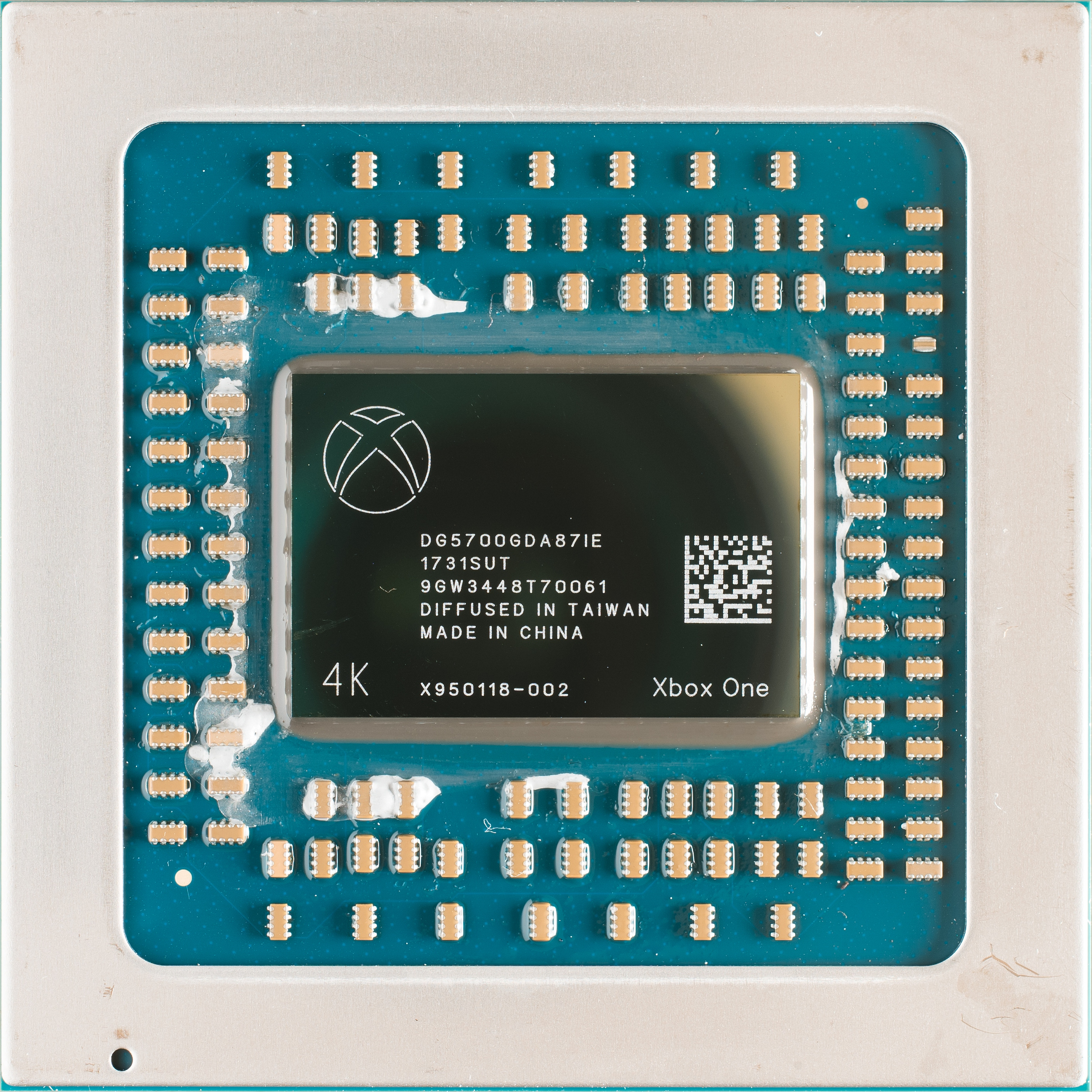
The SoC of an Xbox One X

Die shot of the SoC

Microsoft first teased the Xbox One X, a high-end hardware revision of Xbox One, at E3 2016 under the codename "Project Scorpio", and released it on November 7, 2017, with a 1 TB model priced at US$499 and a limited, preorder exclusive "Project Scorpio Edition", with a dark-gradient finish, vertical stand-brace, and green "Project Scorpio" inscriptions on the console and bundled controller.

Xbox One X features upgraded hardware, designed primarily to render games at 4K resolution and to provide performance improvements for existing games; they can be displayed at full resolution on 4K displays or supersampled for lower-resolution displays. It uses a system-on-chip (SoC) known as Scorpio Engine, which incorporates a 2.3 GHz octa-core CPU, and a Radeon GPU with 40 compute units clocked at 1172 MHz, generating 6 teraflops of graphical computing performance. It also includes 12 GB of GDDR5 RAM with 9 GB allocated to games. Scorpio Engine's CPU utilizes a custom platform designed to maintain compatibility with the Jaguar CPU of the original Xbox One, but with a 31% increase in performance; the custom platform is unrelated to AMD's current Ryzen architecture. The console uses a vapor-chamber method of cooling for the SoC, and motherboards tailored to the exact voltage needs of each individual Scorpio SoC to optimize their output and energy usage. The console also supports AMD's FreeSync technology, 1440p resolution, and/or 120 Hz refresh rate on compatible displays.

Xbox One X is compatible with all existing Xbox One software and accessories, including the Xbox and Xbox 360 games that have been made backward-compatible. To assist in optimizing the new hardware to run existing games at 4K resolution, Microsoft developers used internal debugging software to collect GPU traces from major titles that did not run at full 1080p resolution on the original Xbox One. Halo 5: Guardians, which uses a scaling system that dynamically lowers the game's resolution when needed to maintain a consistent frame rate, was able to run at its native resolution with no scaling on Xbox One X hardware. Phil Spencer touted that Xbox One X's hardware could also support virtual reality, due to its power, price point, and convenience. At the 2017 Game Developers Conference, Microsoft announced plans to support Windows Mixed Reality VR headsets on Xbox One in 2018, but the company later stated that it was initially focusing on PC platforms first, and that it wanted to focus on wireless VR solutions for consoles.

Games marketed by Microsoft as Xbox One X Enhanced have specific optimizations for graphical fidelity on the console's hardware. Separate iconography denotes games that natively run at 4K resolution, or support HDR. Existing games can be updated to provide these enhancements. Though Xbox Games marketing head Aaron Greenberg stated that Xbox One X will have no exclusive titles, general manager of game publishing Shannon Loftis remarked in a follow-up interview that she was not sure on this point and that exclusivity would be "up to the game development community".

Xbox One X has been characterized as a competitor to the PlayStation 4 Pro, a hardware update of the PlayStation 4 released in late 2016 that similarly focuses on 4K gaming and improved virtual reality performance. In October 2016, Penello stated that the performance advantage of Xbox One X over the PS4 Pro would be "obvious", noting that the PS4 Pro's GPU only had 4.2 teraflops of graphical computing performance in comparison to Microsoft's stated 6 teraflops. Some journalists thought that Microsoft's messaging and positioning of Scorpio alongside the release of Xbox One S were at odds with themselves and "confusing".

Production of the Xbox One X was discontinued in July 2020 as Microsoft prepared for the transition to the then-upcoming Xbox Series X console.

=== Hardware comparison ===
		Xbox One		Xbox One S		Xbox One X
		Kinect (Note: Only the model launched in 2013 came bundled with Kinect. Subsequent models did not include the Kinect, and Xbox One S and One X models dropped the Kinect-specific port.)	non-Kinect	(with disc drive)	All-Digital	Xbox One X
Release	500 GB	Nov 22, 2013	Jun 9, 2014	Aug 23, 2016	—N/a	
Release	1 TB	—N/a	Jun 6, 2015	Aug 23, 2016	May 7, 2019	Nov 7, 2017
Release	1 TB	—N/a	Aug 31, 2015 (Elite)	Aug 23, 2016	May 7, 2019	Nov 7, 2017
Release	2 TB	—N/a		Aug 2, 2016 (Note: Special launch edition with limited availability.)	—N/a	
Price (Note: Price at launch. Subsequent price reductions are explained in the attached notes.)	500 GB	$499	$399 (Note: Retail price dropped to $349 in June 2015, $299 in May 2016 before Xbox One S launch, and finally $279 in June 2016 after Xbox One S launch.)	$299 (Note: Price cut by $50 in June 2017 ahead of Xbox One X launch. 500 GB models cut to $249 and 1 TB models cut to $299.)	—N/a	
Price	1 TB	—N/a	$399 (Note: Retail price dropped to $319 in May 2016 ahead of Xbox One S launch.)	$349	$249	$499
Price	1 TB	—N/a	$499 (Elite)	$349	$249	$499
Price	2 TB	—N/a		$399	—N/a	
Discontinued		2016		Q4 2020	July 16, 2020	
Model		1540		1681		1787
CPU	Process	28 nm TSMC		TSMC 16FF+		
CPU	Transistors	5 billion				7 billion
CPU	Die size	363 mm^{2}		240 mm^{2}		360 mm^{2}
CPU	Architecture	AMD Jaguar				AMD-customized Jaguar Evolved
CPU	Frequency	1.75 GHz				2.3 GHz
CPU	Cores	8-core				
GPU	Architecture	AMD Sea Islands (GCN 2) Bonaire type				AMD Polaris (GCN 4) Ellesmere XTL type
GPU	Architecture	(custom UC R7 260)		(custom UC R7 360)		(custom UC RX 580)
GPU	Unified shaders	768 (12 Radeon compute units) (896 installed, 2 CU disabled)				2560 (40 Radeon compute units) (2816 installed, 4 CU disabled)
GPU	Raster operation units (ROP)	16				32
GPU	Texture mapping units (TMU)	48				160
GPU	Frequency	853 MHz		914 MHz		1172 MHz
GPU	FP32 performance	1.3 TFLOPS		1.4 TFLOPS		6 TFLOPS
Memory	Amount	8 GB DDR3; 32 MB ESRAM				12 GB GDDR5
Memory	Bandwidth	DDR3 at 68.3 GB/s				326 GB/s
Memory	Bandwidth	ESRAM at 204 GB/s		ESRAM at 218 GB/s		326 GB/s
Memory	Frequency	1066 MHz (effective 2133 MT/s)				1700 MHz (effective 6800 MT/s)
Memory	Bus	256-bit				384-bit
Storage	Type	2.5-inch hard drive (5400rpm)		2.5-inch hard drive (5400rpm)		
Storage	Type	—N/a	2.5-inch SSHD (Elite)	2.5-inch hard drive (5400rpm)		
Storage	Capacity	500 GB, 1 TB		500 GB, 1 TB, 2 TB	1 TB	
External media drive		Blu-ray optical drive		Ultra HD Blu-ray optical drive	None	Ultra HD Blu-ray optical drive
Dimensions (H×W×D)		79 mm × 274 mm × 333 mm 3.1 in × 10.8 in × 13.1 in		63.5 mm × 229 mm × 298 mm 2.50 in × 9.02 in × 11.73 in		60 mm × 240 mm × 300 mm 2.4 in × 9.4 in × 11.8 in
Output		HDMI 1.4		HDMI 2.0a		HDMI 2.0b

Table notes
