= SimGrid =

Toolkit for distributed computing

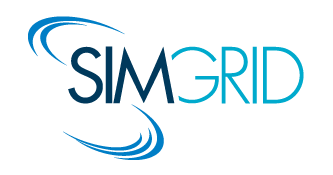
- SimGrid Logo
- Release: 1999; 27 years ago
- Stable release: 4.0 / March 12, 2025; 15 months ago
- Written in: Core: C++; Bindings: Python
- Platform: Unix, Mac OS X, Microsoft Windows
- Type: Distributed system simulator, Network simulator, Model checking
- License: GNU Lesser General Public License version 2.1 only
- Website: simgrid.org
- Repository: https://framagit.org/simgrid/simgrid

SimGrid is a framework for simulating applications on distributed computing systems. It provides high-level programming language tools for comparing, evaluating, analyzing, and prototyping algorithms across different platforms. SimGrid has been used to conduct experimental simulations in multiple domains, including cluster computing, grid computing, heuristics and peer-to-peer (P2P) computing.

SimGrid is distributed as freeware under the GNU Lesser General Public License version 2.1 (LGPL-2.1-only).

== History ==
SimGrid started in 1999 as a joint research project between Henry Casanova and Arnaud Legrand from the University of California, San Diego and École Normale Supérieure de Lyon, respectively. The original design was only used for simulating the scheduling of heuristics for heterogeneous platforms.

SimGrid has received funding from national and international research agencies and has evolved through various projects, including SONGS, USS-SimGrid, and ASTR.

== APIs and models ==
SimGrid supports multiple programming languages, including C++ and Python, through models and APIs.

SimGrid provides tools for analyzing scheduling, resource allocation, fault tolerance, and other aspects of distributed computing through four distinct interfaces:

- Simulation Directed Acyclic Graphs (SIMDAG) simulates execution of DAGs, including specified tasks, dependencies, scheduling resources, and interaction with the environment. It allows users to add tasks, specify dependencies, and interact with the environment.
- Meta Scheduling Grid (MSG) is used for solving constraint satisfaction problems.
- Grid Reality and Simulation (GRAS) simulates deployable distributed applications.
- Simulated Message Passing Interface (SMPI) simulates MPI applications.

== Release history ==
Version	Release date	Significant changes
SimGrid v1.0	1999	First release of SimGrid; Scheduled algorithms for heterogeneous platforms
SimGrid v2.0	2003	More realistic network models and topologies; Enabled the simulation of distributed scheduling agents
SimGrid v3.3	2009	Complete rewrite of the simulation core for better modularity, speed and scalability
SimGrid v4.0	March 12, 2025	Reworked the platform generation API to simplify it and make it more natural
SimGrid v4.1	November 11, 2025	Added the ability to unseal a network zone; Refactored the whole CI infrastructure

== See also ==
- BIGSIM
- Directed Acyclic Graph
- Cloud computing
- CloudSim
