= Dance Central Spotlight =

2014 video game

- Developer: Harmonix
- Publisher: Microsoft Studios
- Series: Dance Central
- Platform: Xbox One
- Release: September 2, 2014
- Genre: Rhythm
- Modes: Single-player, multiplayer

Dance Central Spotlight is a 2014 rhythm game developed by Harmonix and published by Microsoft Studios for the Xbox One Kinect. It is the sequel to Dance Central 3 (2012) and the fourth installment in the Dance Central series. It is also the final Dance Central game to be released for an Xbox console, and the final first-party game overall to require the Kinect sensor. The game provides a stripped-down experience in comparison to previous Dance Central titles, maintaining the core gameplay of the series, but with a focus on providing more routines per-song, the regular release of recent songs as downloadable content, and leverage of improvements to the motion detection capabilities of the Kinect for Xbox One. It was released on September 2, 2014.

== Gameplay ==
Similarly to previous installments in the franchise, players must mirror the dance routine of an on-screen dancer, as instructed by "flash cards" indicating specific moves in the routine. Players are judged and scored on the accuracy of their performance. Each song includes up to eight routines, including four difficulty levels of the standard routine, along with two fitness-oriented routines and two "alternate" routines. Additional routines and difficulty levels are unlocked for songs by collecting flash cards by getting "Flawless" ratings on individual moves.

Spotlight includes songs from artists like Rihanna, Lorde and Pharrell Williams. It focuses primarily on the core gameplay of the franchise, with a simplified offering of standard and fitness modes, and no story mode or other minigames like past versions. The practice mode was overhauled to use a dynamic, "on-demand" approach, rather than the "regimented" approach used by previous Dance Central games: players can now jump to training mode in-game by using a voice or controller command. Once activated, the player can practice the relevant portion, slow down the routine, and go to different parts of the song. When the player exits practice, the song continues from where it was left off.

The following ten songs are bundled with the game:

Song	Artist	Year
"#thatPOWER"	Justin Bieber ft. will.i.am	2013
"Counting Stars"	OneRepublic	2013
"Diamonds"	Rihanna	2012
"Happy"	Pharrell Williams	2013
"I Wish"	Cher Lloyd	2013
"Royals"	Lorde	2013
"Show Me"	Chris Brown ft. Kid Ink	2013
"Talk Dirty"	Jason Derulo & 2 Chainz	2013
"Titanium"	David Guetta ft. Sia	2011
"Wake Me Up"	Avicii	2013

== Development and release ==
Dance Central Spotlight was unveiled at E3 2014. The overall gameplay of the Dance Central franchise was enhanced by the increased capabilities of the Xbox One Kinect sensor, which has a higher resolution camera and better gesture recognition than the Xbox 360 iteration. In total, the game can recognize 7,000 different dance moves. Harmonix director Matthew Nordhaus also teased the presence of tougher alternate routines for individual songs, aimed particularly at expert players. Harmonix co-founder Alex Rigopulos felt that Microsoft's introduction of lower-cost Xbox One bundles excluding Kinect wasn't a "shock" and the bundling of Kinect with Xbox One on launch did not influence the development of Spotlight in any way.

Unlike previous installments in the franchise, Spotlight places a heavy emphasis on downloadable content and the ability for players to purchase songs on an À la carte basis; Nordhaus noted that due to improvements in motion capture technology and the need to perform fewer QA tests because of the improved Kinect accuracy (specifically noting the need to do large levels of tuning for hand detection on the Xbox 360 version), Harmonix staff could produce new routines for the game in just "days" rather than months. Emphasizing that players wanted to have quicker in-game access to current hit music, Nordhaus stated that Harmonix would now be able to release new songs as DLC while they are still charting.

Dance Central Spotlight was officially released on September 2, 2014; unlike other installments in the series, the game is only available via digital means. The base game includes 10 songs; new songs for the game were released on a near-weekly basis for a "substantial" period of time. A pre-paid code to download Spotlight is also included with standalone Kinect for Xbox One units, which were released on October 7, 2014.

On March 8, 2015, Nisha and Claptrap (despite his lack of legs and using a wheel) from the Borderlands franchise were added as bonus characters via cheat codes; Harmonix had partnered with 2K in animating a titular sequence of the "moon dance break" trailer for Borderlands: The Pre-Sequel!, (which was being re-released for Xbox One later that month alongside a port of Borderlands 2, as part of Borderlands: The Handsome Collection).

=== Legacy downloadable content ===
All DLC from previous Dance Central games were ported to Spotlight—they were re-released progressively in batches following the game's release. The ported DLC include their standard routines from the original version (with additional moves not seen in the original version for Dance Central 1 songs), along with four alternate routines, as with Spotlight-specific songs. Songs that were previously purchased on the Xbox 360 versions of Dance Central can be re-downloaded on Spotlight at no extra charge.

Song	Artist	Year	Release date on Spotlight	Still available for purchase
"Airplanes"	B.o.B ft. Hayley Williams	2010	September 2, 2014	Yes
"Alejandro"	Lady Gaga	2010	September 2, 2014	Yes
"Because of You"	Ne-Yo	2007	September 2, 2014	Yes
"Closer"	Ne-Yo	2008	September 2, 2014	Yes
"Commander"	Kelly Rowland ft. David Guetta	2011	September 2, 2014	Yes
"D.A.N.C.E."	Justice	2007	September 2, 2014	Yes
"Don't Touch Me (Throw da Water on 'Em)"	Busta Rhymes	2008	September 2, 2014	No
"Get Busy"	Sean Paul	2003	September 2, 2014	Yes
"Get It Shawty"	Lloyd	2007	September 2, 2014	Yes
"Get Up (I Feel Like Being a) Sex Machine, Pt. 1"	James Brown	1970	September 2, 2014	Yes
"Girls and Boys"	Blur	1994	September 2, 2014	No
"Heard 'Em All"	Amerie	2009	September 2, 2014	Yes
"Hello Good Morning"	Diddy-Dirty Money ft. T.I.	2010	September 2, 2014	Yes
"I Got You Dancing"	Lady Sovereign	2009	September 2, 2014	No
"La La Land"	Demi Lovato	2008	September 2, 2014	Yes
"Lapdance"	N.E.R.D.	2001	September 2, 2014	Yes
"Marry the Night"	Lady Gaga	2011	September 2, 2014	Yes
"Paparazzi"	Lady Gaga	2009	September 2, 2014	Yes
"Round & Round"	Selena Gomez & the Scene	2010	September 2, 2014	Yes
"Say Hey (I Love You)"	Michael Franti & Spearhead feat. Cherine Anderson	2008	September 2, 2014	Yes
"Temperature"	Sean Paul	2006	September 2, 2014	Yes
"The Edge Of Glory"	Lady Gaga	2011	September 2, 2014	Yes
"Turnin Me On"	Keri Hilson	2008	September 2, 2014	Yes
"Weapon of Choice"	Fatboy Slim	2001	September 2, 2014	Yes
"Whip It"	Nicki Minaj	2012	September 2, 2014	Yes
"Don't Cha"	The Pussycat Dolls ft. Busta Rhymes	2005	September 16, 2014	Yes
"Le Freak"	Chic	1978	September 16, 2014	Yes
"Planet Rock"	Afrika Bambaataa and the Soul Sonic Force	1982	September 16, 2014	No
"Say Aah"	Trey Songz	2010	September 16, 2014	Yes
"Fergalicious"	Fergie ft. will.i.am	2006	September 23, 2014	Yes
"Hollaback Girl"	Gwen Stefani	2005	September 23, 2014	Yes
"London Bridge"	Fergie	2006	September 23, 2014	Yes
"We Run This"	Missy Elliott	2006	September 23, 2014	Yes
"Control"	Janet Jackson	1986	September 30, 2014	Yes
"Escapade"	Janet Jackson	1989	September 30, 2014	No
"Nasty"	Janet Jackson	1986	September 30, 2014	Yes
"Party Rock Anthem"	LMFAO ft. Lauren Bennett & GoonRock	2011	September 30, 2014	Yes
"Sorry for Party Rocking"	LMFAO	2012	September 30, 2014	Yes
"All Around the World"	Justin Bieber ft. Ludacris	2012	October 7, 2014	Yes
"Beauty and a Beat"	Justin Bieber ft. Nicki Minaj	2012	October 7, 2014	Yes
"Never Say Never"	Justin Bieber ft. Jaden Smith	2010	October 7, 2014	Yes
"Lights"	Ellie Goulding	2011	October 14, 2014	Yes
"Let It Roll"	Flo Rida	2012	October 21, 2014	Yes
"Low"	Flo Rida ft. T-Pain	2007	October 21, 2014	Yes
"Give Me Everything"	Pitbull ft. Ne-Yo, Afrojack & Nayer	2011	October 28, 2014	Yes
"Hey Baby (Drop It to the Floor)"	Pitbull ft. T-Pain	2010	October 28, 2014	Yes
"International Love"	Pitbull ft. Chris Brown	2011	October 28, 2014	Yes
"Disturbia"	Rihanna	2008	November 4, 2014	Yes
"Only Girl (In the World)"	Rihanna	2010	November 4, 2014	Yes
"S&M"	Rihanna	2011	November 4, 2014	Yes
"SOS"	Rihanna	2006	November 4, 2014	Yes
"Umbrella"	Rihanna ft. Jay-Z	2007	November 4, 2014	Yes
"What's My Name"	Rihanna ft. Drake	2010	November 4, 2014	Yes
"Gangnam Style"	PSY	2012	December 2, 2014	Yes
"Yeah 3x"	Chris Brown	2010	December 2, 2014	Yes
"Euphoria"	Usher	2012	December 16, 2014	Yes
"Twisted"	Usher ft. Pharrell	2012	December 16, 2014	Yes
"I Gotta Feeling"	The Black Eyed Peas	2009	December 30, 2014	Yes
"Call Me Maybe"	Carly Rae Jepsen	2011	January 6, 2015	Yes
"Forget You"	Cee Lo Green	2010	January 6, 2015	Yes
"Glad You Came"	The Wanted	2011	January 6, 2015	Yes
"Take Care"	Drake ft. Rihanna	2012	January 6, 2015	Yes
"Hot In Herre"	Nelly	2002	January 13, 2015	Yes
"Promiscuous"	Nelly Furtado ft. Timbaland	2006	January 20, 2015	Yes
"The Way I Are"	Timbaland ft. Keri Hilson & D.O.E. & Sebastian	2007	January 27, 2015	Yes
"We No Speak Americano"	Yolanda Be Cool & DCUP	2010	February 3, 2015	Yes
"Scenario"	A Tribe Called Quest And Leaders of the New School	1992	February 10, 2015	Yes
"Down On Me"	Jeremih ft. 50 Cent	2010	February 17, 2015	Yes
"Gonna Make You Sweat (Everybody Dance Now)"	C+C Music Factory	1990	February 24, 2015	Yes
"Word Up"	Cameo	1986	March 3, 2015	Yes
"Milkshake"	Kelis	2003	March 10, 2015	Yes
"Let It Rock"	Kevin Rudolf ft. Lil Wayne	2008	March 17, 2015	Yes
"Lean wit It, Rock wit It"	Dem Franchize Boyz	2006	March 24, 2015	Yes
"O.P.P."	Naughty by Nature	1991	March 31, 2015	Yes
"Straight Up"	Paula Abdul	1988	April 7, 2015	Yes
"Super Freak"	Rick James	1981	April 14, 2015	Yes
"Whoomp! (There It Is)"	Tag Team	1993	April 28, 2015	Yes
"Spice Up Your Life (Stent Radio Mix)"	Spice Girls	1997	May 5, 2015	Yes
"Informer"	Snow	1993	May 12, 2015	Yes
"Whine Up"	Kat DeLuna ft. Elephant Man	2007	May 19, 2015	Yes
"Tempted to Touch"	Rupee	2004	May 26, 2015	Yes
"Break Your Heart"	Taio Cruz Ft. Ludacris	2010	June 2, 2015	Yes
"Replay"	Iyaz	2009	June 2, 2015	Yes

=== Spotlight downloadable content ===
Song	Artist	Year	Release date	Still available for purchase
"A Little Respect"	Erasure	1988	September 2, 2014	Yes
"I Love It"	Icona Pop	2013	September 2, 2014	Yes
"Let Me Love You (Until You Learn to Love Yourself)"	Ne-Yo	2012	September 2, 2014	Yes
"Little Talks"	Of Monsters and Men	2011	September 2, 2014	Yes
"Love Shack"	The B-52s	1989	September 2, 2014	Yes
"Maps"	Maroon 5	2014	September 2, 2014	Yes
"Next to Me"	Emeli Sandé	2012	September 2, 2014	Yes
"One More Night"	Maroon 5	2012	September 2, 2014	Yes
"Pompeii"	Bastille	2013	September 2, 2014	Yes
"Problem"	Ariana Grande ft. Iggy Azalea	2014	September 2, 2014	Yes
"Safe and Sound"	Capital Cities	2011	September 2, 2014	Yes
"Scream & Shout"	will.i.am ft. Britney Spears	2012	September 2, 2014	Yes
"Summer"	Calvin Harris	2014	September 2, 2014	Yes
"Summertime Sadness (Cedric Gervais Remix)"	Lana Del Rey vs. Cedric Gervais	2012	September 2, 2014	Yes
"Take On Me"	a-ha	1984	September 2, 2014	Yes
"Turn Down for What"	DJ Snake & Lil Jon	2013	September 2, 2014	Yes
"Here Comes the Hotstepper"	Ini Kamoze	1994	September 2, 2014	Yes
"Heart Attack"	Demi Lovato	2013	September 2, 2014	Yes
"I Need Your Love"	Calvin Harris ft. Ellie Goulding	2013	September 2, 2014	Yes
"Ain't It Fun"	Paramore	2013	September 2, 2014	Yes
"All of Me (Tiësto's Birthday Treatment Remix [Radio Edit])"	John Legend	2014	September 2, 2014	Yes
"Creep"	TLC	1994	September 2, 2014	Yes
"Am I Wrong"	Nico & Vinz	2013	September 2, 2014	Yes
"Come & Get It"	Selena Gomez	2013	September 2, 2014	Yes
"Applause"	Lady Gaga	2013	September 2, 2014	Yes
"Bailando"	Enrique Iglesias ft. Sean Paul, Descemer Bueno & Gente de Zona	2014	September 2, 2014	Yes
"The Way"	Ariana Grande ft. Mac Miller	2013	September 16, 2014	Yes
"Latch"	Disclosure ft. Sam Smith	2012	September 23, 2014	Yes
"Fancy"	Iggy Azalea ft. Charli XCX	2014	September 30, 2014	Yes
"Black Widow"	Iggy Azalea ft. Rita Ora	2014	September 30, 2014	Yes
"As Long as You Love Me"	Justin Bieber ft. Big Sean	2012	October 7, 2014	Yes
"Burn"	Ellie Goulding	2013	October 14, 2014	Yes
"Bang Bang"	Jessie J, Ariana Grande & Nicki Minaj	2014	October 14, 2014	Yes
"I Cry"	Flo Rida	2012	October 21, 2014	Yes
"Chandelier"	Sia	2014	November 4, 2014	Yes
"Love Runs Out"	OneRepublic	2014	November 11, 2014	Yes
"Anaconda"	Nicki Minaj	2014	November 18, 2014	Yes
"Can't Hold Us"	Macklemore & Ryan Lewis ft. Ray Dalton	2011	November 25, 2014	No
"Blurred Lines"	Robin Thicke ft. T.I. & Pharrell	2013	November 25, 2014	Yes
"Animals"	Maroon 5	2014	November 25, 2014	Yes
"Don't Tell 'Em"	Jeremih ft. YG	2014	December 2, 2014	Yes
"Somebody That I Used to Know"	Gotye ft. Kimbra	2011	December 9, 2014	Yes
"Turn Me On"	David Guetta ft. Nicki Minaj	2011	December 9, 2014	Yes
"Locked Out of Heaven"	Bruno Mars	2012	December 16, 2014	Yes
"Ready To Run"	One Direction	2013	December 23, 2014	Yes
"Story Of My Life"	One Direction	2013	December 23, 2014	Yes
"Raise Your Glass"	P!nk	2010	December 30, 2014	Yes
"GDFR"	Flo Rida ft. Sage The Gemini and Lookas	2014	April 28, 2015	Yes
"Uptown Funk"	Mark Ronson ft Bruno Mars	2014	April 28, 2015	Yes

== Reception ==
Reception

Review scores
Publication	Score
4Players	82/100
Destructoid	7/10
Game Informer	6/10
IGN	7.4/10
Paste	7.5/10

GameSpot gave Spotlight an 8 out of 10, praising its cleaner interface and dropping of extraneous features for "[removing] the obstacles between you and just getting out there and dancing", and its new business model as a "tremendous value" for players. However, its minimalistic feedback for player performance was considered a double-edged sword due to the new unlock system's emphasis on rewarding the learning of individual moves.
