= Trace-based simulation =

In computer science, trace-based simulation refers to system simulation performed by looking at traces of program execution or system component access with the purpose of performance prediction.

Trace-based simulation may be used in a variety of applications, from the analysis of solid state disks to the message passing performance on very large computer clusters.

Traced-based simulators usually have two components: one that executes actions and stores the results (i.e. traces) and another which reads the log files of traces and interpolates them to new (and often more complex) scenarios.

For instance, in the case of large computer cluster design, the execution takes place on a small number of nodes, and traces are left in log files. The simulator reads those log files and simulates performance on a much larger number of nodes, thus providing a view of the performance of very large applications, based on the execution traces on a much smaller number of nodes.

== See also ==
- BIGSIM
