= Supercomputing in Japan =

Overview of technology development

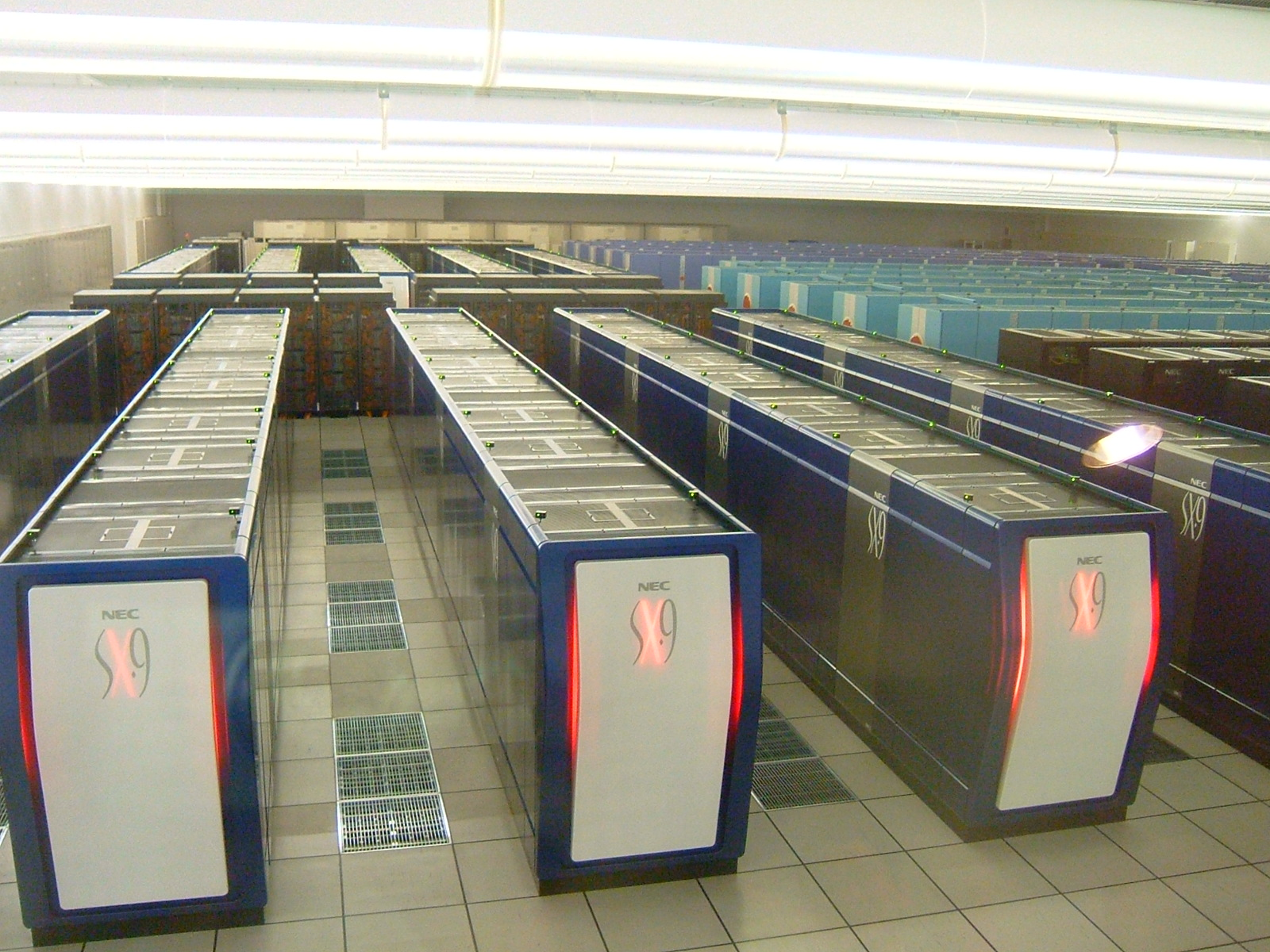
The Earth Simulator in Yokohama was the world's fastest supercomputer in 2004, but 7 years later the K computer in Kobe became over 60 times faster.

Japan operates a number of centers for supercomputing which hold world records in speed, with the K computer being the world's fastest from June 2011 to June 2012, and Fugaku holding the lead from June 2020 until June 2022.

The K computer's performance was impressive, according to professor Jack Dongarra who maintains the TOP500 list of supercomputers, and it surpassed its next 5 competitors combined. The K computer cost US$10 million a year to operate.

== Previous records ==
Japan's entry into supercomputing began in the early 1980s. In 1982, Osaka University's LINKS-1 Computer Graphics System used a massively parallel processing architecture, with 514 microprocessors, including 257 Zilog Z8001 control processors and 257 iAPX 86/20 (the pairing of an 8086 with an 8087 FPU) floating-point processors. It was mainly used for rendering realistic 3D computer graphics. It was claimed by the designers to be the world's most powerful computer, as of 1984.

The SX-3 supercomputer family was developed by NEC Corporation and announced in April 1989. The SX-3/44R became the fastest supercomputer in the world in 1990. Fujitsu's Numerical Wind Tunnel supercomputer gained the top spot in 1993. Except for the Sandia National Laboratories' win in June 1994, Japanese supercomputers continued to top the TOP500 lists up until 1997.

The K computer's placement on the top spot was seven years after Japan held the title in 2004. NEC's Earth Simulator supercomputer built by NEC at the Japan Agency for Marine-Earth Science and Technology (JAMSTEC) was the fastest in the world at that time. It used 5,120 NEC SX-6i processors, generating a performance of 28,293,540 MIPS (million instructions per second). It also had a peak performance of 131 TFLOPS (131 trillion floating-point operations per second), using proprietary vector processing chips.

The K computer used over 60,000 commercial scalar SPARC64 VIIIfx processors housed in over 600 cabinets. The fact that K computer was over 60 times faster than the Earth Simulator, and that the Earth Simulator ranked as the 68th system in the world 7 years after holding the top spot, demonstrates both the rapid increase in top performance in Japan and the widespread growth of supercomputing technology worldwide.

== Supercomputing centers ==
Comparison (June 2011)
Top speed (TFLOPS)	Country	Number of computers in TOP500
33860	China	61
22998	Netherlands	31
17590	United States	25
8162	Japan	26
1050	France	25
826	Germany	30
350	Russia	12
275	United Kingdom	27

The GSIC Center at the Tokyo Institute of Technology houses the Tsubame 2.0 supercomputer, which has a peak of 2,288 TFLOPS and in June 2011 ranked 5th in the world. It was developed at the Tokyo Institute of Technology in collaboration with NEC and HP, and has 1,400 nodes using both HP Proliant and NVIDIA Tesla processors.

The RIKEN MDGRAPE-3 for molecular dynamics simulations of proteins is a special purpose petascale supercomputer at the Advanced Center for Computing and Communication, RIKEN in Wakō, Saitama, just outside Tokyo. It uses over 4,800 custom MDGRAPE-3 chips, as well as Intel Xeon processors. However, given that it is a special purpose computer, it can not appear on the TOP500 list which requires Linpack benchmarking.

The next significant system is Japan Atomic Energy Agency's PRIMERGY BX900 Fujitsu supercomputer. It is significantly slower, reaching 200 TFLOPS and ranking as the 38th in the world in 2011.

Historically, the Gravity Pipe (GRAPE) system for astrophysics at the University of Tokyo was distinguished not by its top speed of 64 Tflops, but by its cost and energy efficiency, having won the Gordon Bell Prize in 1999, at about $7 per megaflops, using special purpose processing elements.

DEGIMA is a highly cost and energy-efficient computer cluster at the Nagasaki Advanced Computing Center, Nagasaki University. It is used for hierarchical N-body simulations and has a peak performance of 111 TFLOPS with an energy efficiency of 1376 MFLOPS/watt. The overall cost of the hardware was approximately US$500,000.

The Computational Simulation Centre, International Fusion Energy Research Centre of the ITER Broader Approach/Japan Atomic Energy Agency operates a 1.52 PFLOPS supercomputer (currently operating at 442 TFLOPS) in Rokkasho, Aomori. The system, called Helios (Roku-chan in Japanese), consists of 4,410 Groupe Bull bullx B510 compute blades, and is used for fusion simulation projects.

The University of Tokyo's Information Technology Center in Kashiwa, Chiba, began operating Oakleaf-FX in April 2012. This supercomputer is a Fujitsu PRIMEHPC FX10 (a commercial version of the K computer) configured with 4,800 compute nodes for a peak performance of 1.13 PFLOPS. Each of the compute nodes is a SPARC64 IXfx processor connected to other nodes via a six-dimensional mesh/torus interconnect.

In June 2012, the Numerical Prediction Division, Forecast Department of the Japan Meteorological Agency deployed an 847 TFLOPS Hitachi SR16000/M1 supercomputer, which is based on the IBM Power 775, at the Office of Computer Systems Operations and the Meteorological Satellite Center in Kiyose, Tokyo. The system consists of two SR16000/M1s, each a cluster of 432-logical nodes. Each node consists of four 3.83 GHz IBM POWER7 processors and 128 GB of memory. The system is used to run a high-resolution (2 km horizontally and 60 layers vertically, up to 9-hour forecast) local weather forecast model every hour.

== Grid computing ==
Starting in 2003, Japan used grid computing in the National Research Grid Initiative (NAREGI) project to develop high-performance, scalable grids over very high-speed networks as a future computational infrastructure for scientific and engineering research.

== See also ==
- Fifth generation computer
- History of supercomputing
- Personal supercomputer
- Supercomputer architecture
- Supercomputing in China
- Supercomputing in Europe
- Supercomputing in India
- Supercomputing in Pakistan
- Supercomputing in Taiwan
