= Soun Takeda =

Japanese calligrapher

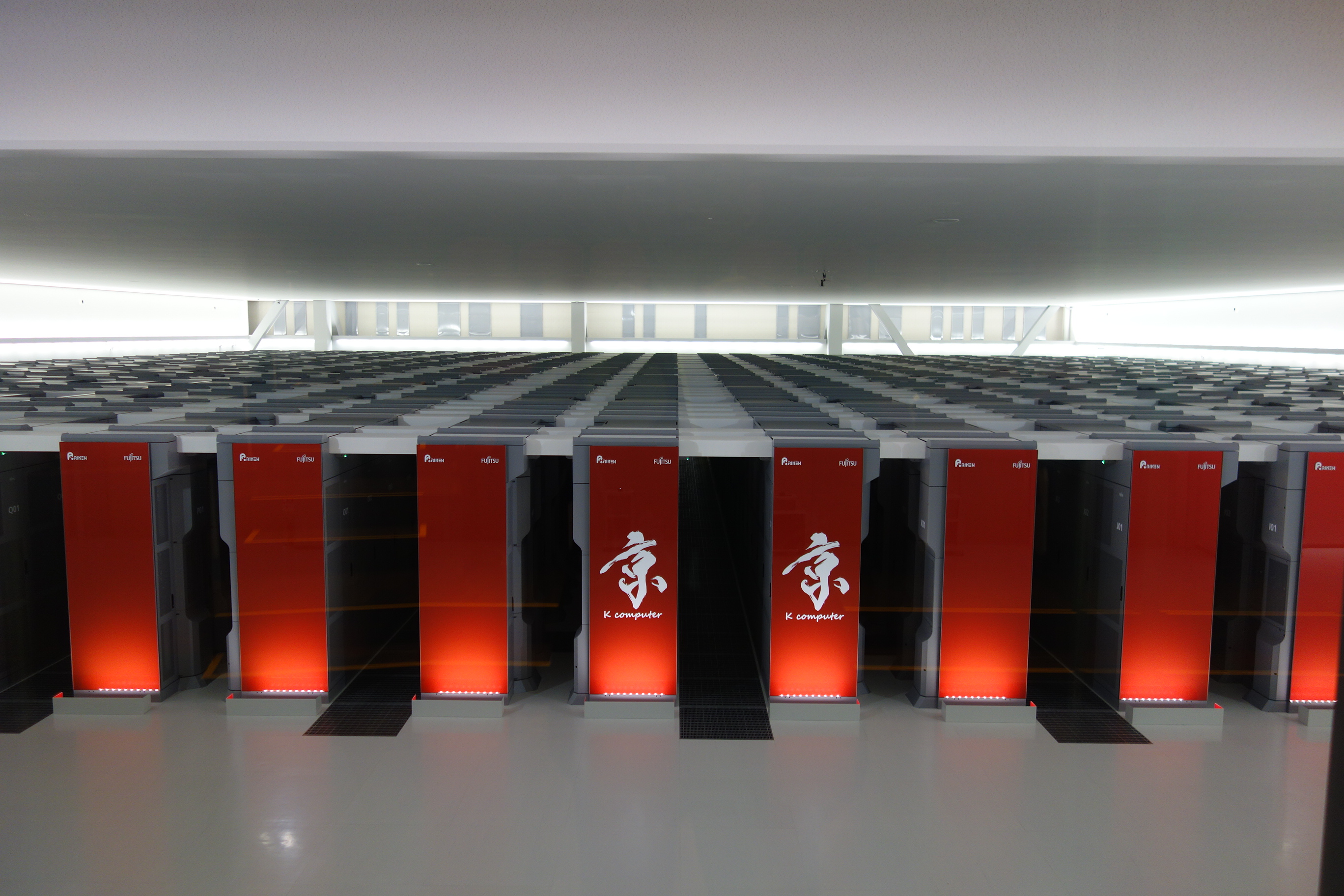
Logo of K Supercomputer attributed to Takeda

Takeda Sōun (Japanese: 武田双雲, Hepburn: Sōun Takeda, born Takeda Daichi on 9 June 1975) is a Japanese calligrapher. He is from Kumamoto, Kumamoto Prefecture. He is 1.85 m (6 ft 2 in) tall.

== Education ==
He graduated from Kumamoto City Onoue Elementary School, Kumamoto City Nishikigaoka Junior High School, Kumamoto Marist Gakuen High School, and Tokyo University of Science, Faculty of Science and Technology, Department of Information Science.

== Calligraphy ==
Before getting into calligraphy, he worked as a sales representative for NTT East Japan for two and a half years. He was known for his good handwriting within the department, but when he wrote the name of a female employee, the woman was moved to tears and said, "I used to hate my name, but now I like it for the first time." Taking this as an opportunity, he resigned the next day.

He studied calligraphy at his mother Futaba Takeda's calligraphy class for a year, and then started working as a street calligrapher. He held his first solo exhibition in his mid-20s. He exhibited his improvised writing style on the roadside at the request of passersby, and was later featured on television and other media for his large-character performance using ink. He attracted attention in the field of design calligraphy, such as the title characters of NHK's historical drama.

He is left-handed but uses his right hand when writing. He can, however, write with his left hand. He wrote the logo for the K Supercomputer. In June 2019, he won the 38th Best Father Yellow Ribbon Award in the Academic and Cultural category.

== Bibliography ==
- Takeda Soun, "The Pleasure of Writing Calligraphy," Kobunsha (Kobunsha Shinsho), December 14, 2004. ISBN 978-4334032845.
- Takeda Soun, "The Way of Calligraphy - An Introduction to Soun-ryu Free Calligraphy," Ikeda Shoten, September 16, 2005. ISBN 978-4262145150.
- Takeda Soun, "Tanoshika," Diamond Inc., April 14, 2006. ISBN 978-4478703465.
- Takeda Soun, "Hiraku Kotoba," Kawade Shobo Shinsha, June 1, 2008. ISBN 978-4309018669.
- Takeda Soun, "Shohon Kanji," Ikeda Shoten, July 29, 2008. ISBN 978-4262145280.
- Takeda Soun, Shobon Hiragana, Ikeda Shoten, July 29, 2008. ISBN 978-4262145273.
- Takeda Soun, Don't Always Order Carbonara: Soun's Admonishment to Yourself, Shunyodo Shoten, January 2009. ISBN 978-4394902645.
- Takeda Soun, Let's Follow the Path of Calligraphy, PHP Institute, YA Friends of the Heart Series, April 23, 2009. ISBN 978-4569689500.
- Takeda Soun, The World's Most Wanted Lesson on How to Live: 365 Days of Enjoyable Living, Mikasa Shobo, Chiteki Ikikata Bunko, August 20, 2009. ISBN 978-4837978077.
- Takeda Soun, "Takeda Soun: Writing about Sengoku Warlords," Pia (Tenchijin Official Book), September 30, 2009. ISBN 978-4835617435.
- Takeda Soun, "Kanji Power," BNN Shinsha, December 9, 2009. ISBN 978-4861006616.
- Takeda Soun, "Takeda Soun's 72 Seasons of Ink Writing: Words to Convey the Seasons," Asahi Shimbun Publications (Asahi Shinsho), April 13, 2010. ISBN 978-4022733337.
- Takeda Soun, "Be Fooled by Takeda Soun: 77 Ways to Instantly Make Your Life Enjoyable," Shufunotomosha, April 28, 2010. ISBN 978-4072703663.
- Takeda Soun, "The Recommendation of a Good Mood," Heibonsha (Heibonsha Shinsho), May 15, 2010. ISBN 978-4256192535.
- Takeda Soun, "Souun Style Communication," Mainichi Shimbunsha (Heibonsha Shinsho), September 18, 2010. ISBN 978-4620320137.
- Takeda Soun, "The Positive Textbook: Three Basics and 11 Rules for Making Yourself and Those Around You Lucky," Shufunotomosha, November 29, 2013. ISBN 978-4-07-293108-0
- Takeda Soun, "The True Nature of Emptiness," 2015, Asahi Shimbun Publications, ISBN 978-4-02-251329-8
- Takeda Soun, "The Way of Politeness: The Best Method to Free Yourself from Stress," Shodensha, December 1, 2021. ISBN 978-4-396-61770-7
- "The Textbook of 'Thank You': 30 Techniques of Gratitude to Bring Only Good Things to Your Face," 2022, Subarusha, ISBN 9784799110423
