= A64FX =

A64FX may refer to:

- Athlon 64 FX, a 2003 AMD processor
- Fujitsu A64FX, a 2019 processor
