= National Supercomputing Center of Tianjin =

Supercomputing facility in Tianjin, China

The National Supercomputing Center of Tianjin (Chinese: 国家超级计算天津中心; pinyin: guójiā chāojí jìsuàn zhōngxīn) is a supercomputing facility located at the National Defense Science and Technology University in Tianjin, China. One of the fastest supercomputers in the world (see "The TOP500 Project" list of supercomputers), Tianhe-1A, is located at the facility.

== History ==
The Tianjin Computer Institute had been active as far back as 1984 and had developed the 16-bit TQ-0671 microcomputer system. As the National Supercomputing Center, the facilities came under the direction (purview) of the National Supercomputing Center council, consisting of members of the National Defense Science and Technology University, the various departments of the Tianjin Economic and Technological Development Zone, and the Tianjin Binhai New Area Administrative Committee. The facilities have been used by various people through the Beijing and Tianjin area. The center was built with the purpose of encouraging and initiating technological development and scientific innovation in the Tianjin Binhai New Area. Plans include both commercial and military interests. It was built to fulfill three primary objectives:

# The completion of the national supercomputing center, a major national scientific and technological service platform, industrial technology innovation platform human resources, training platform.

1. To establish and improve the information industry in Tianjin Binhai New Area technological innovation system, and build high-performance computing applied R & D centers.
2. The establishment of production and research cooperation mechanisms, in order to project as a link to drive high-performance computing services, R & D and production of high-performance computers and other related information industry.

— National Supercomputing Center, Purpose and Target"

A commercial affiliate of the Tianjin center had previously made the PHPC100 "personal supercomputer" in 2008 which was about twice the size of a normal desktop computer, but had 40 times the speed. In 2010 a second generation model was released.

On August 12, 2015, the center was forced to shut down for a time (it was still offline as of August 14) due to widespread infrastructural damage, along with related security concerns, incurred as a result of the 2015 Tianjin port disaster.

=== Tianhe-1A ===
In October 2010, Tianhe-1A, a separate supercomputer, was unveiled at HPC 2010 China. It is now equipped with 14,336 Xeon X5670 processors and 7,168 Nvidia Tesla M2050 general purpose GPUs. 2,048 NUDT FT1000 heterogeneous processors are also installed in the system, but their computing power was not counted into the machine's official Linpack statistics as of October 2010. Tianhe-1A has a theoretical peak performance of 4.701 petaflops.

It is used to carry out computations for petroleum exploration and aircraft simulation. It is an "open access" computer meaning it provides services for other countries.

== See also ==
- Supercomputer centers in China
