= PRIMEHPC FX10 =

Fujitsu supercomputer

The PRIMEHPC FX10 is a supercomputer designed and manufactured by Fujitsu. Announced on 7 November 2011 at the Supercomputing Conference, the PRIMEHPC FX10 is an improved and commercialized version of the K computer, which was the first supercomputer to obtain more than 10 PFLOPS on the LINPACK benchmark. In its largest configuration, the PRIMEHPC FX10 has a peak performance 23.2 PFLOPS, power consumption of 22.4 MW, and a list price of US$655.4 million. It was succeeded by the PRIMEHPC FX100 with SPARC64 XIfx processors in 2015.

== Specifications ==
- Node specifications:
  - Theoretical peak performance: 236.5 GFLOPS
  - Processor: One 1.848 GHz, 16-core SPARC64 IXfx
  - Memory capacity: 32 or 64 GB
  - Memory bandwidth: 85 GB/s
  - Tofu Interconnect link bandwidth: 5 GB/s per direction (Tofu has dedicated links for each direction)
- System specifications:
  - 4 to 1,024 racks
  - 384 to 98,304 compute nodes
  - Theoretical peak performance: 90.8 TFLOPS to 23.2 PFLOPS
  - Total memory capacity: 12 TB to 6 PB
  - Interconnect: Torus fusion (Tofu); 6D mesh/torus hybrid
  - Cooling method: Direct water cooling and air cooling (with optional exhaust cooling unit)
- Operating System:
  - Linux-based

== Installations ==
The first installation of the PRIMEHPC FX10 was at the University of Tokyo's Information Technology Center. Named Oakleaf-FX, the system has a peak performance of 1.135 PFLOPS and consists of 4,800 nodes (for a total of 76,800 cores) and 150 TB of memory in 50 racks. Oakleaf-FX was ordered in November 2011, and it became operational in April 2012. In June 2012 was ranked as the 18th fastest supercomputer in the 39th TOP500 list of the fastest supercomputers, with a LINPACK benchmark performance of 1.043 PFLOPS.

In June 2012, Fujitsu received an order from Taiwan's Central Weather Bureau, the first PRIMEHPC FX10 sale outside of Japan. This system, which was installed in 2014, has a performance of over 1 PFLOPS.

In addition to serving as a platform for high-performance computing, the PRIMEHPC FX10 was also intended to serve as a software development platform for the K computer, which it is compatible with. Fujitsu has sold several systems for K computer software development, including a 96-node system in June 2012 to Kobe University's Graduate School of Informatics, and 384-node system in August 2012 to the University of Tokyo's Institute for Solid-State Physics.

== See also ==
- K computer
- Supercomputing in Japan
- TOP500
