= Torus interconnect =

Type of geometry for connecting computer nodes

A torus interconnect is a switch-less network topology for connecting processing nodes in a parallel computer system.

Diagram of a 3-dimensional torus interconnect. It is not limited to 8 nodes but can consist of any number of nodes in a similar rectilinear array.

== Introduction ==
In geometry, a torus is created by revolving a circle about an axis coplanar to the circle. While this is a general definition in geometry, the topological properties of this type of shape describes the network topology in its essence.

=== Geometry illustration ===
In the representations below, the first is a one dimension torus, a simple circle. The second is a two dimension torus, in the shape of a 'doughnut'. The animation illustrates how a two dimension torus is generated from a rectangle by connecting its two pairs of opposite edges. At one dimension, a torus topology is equivalent to a ring interconnect network, in the shape of a circle. At two dimensions, it becomes equivalent to a two dimension mesh, but with extra connection at the edge nodes.

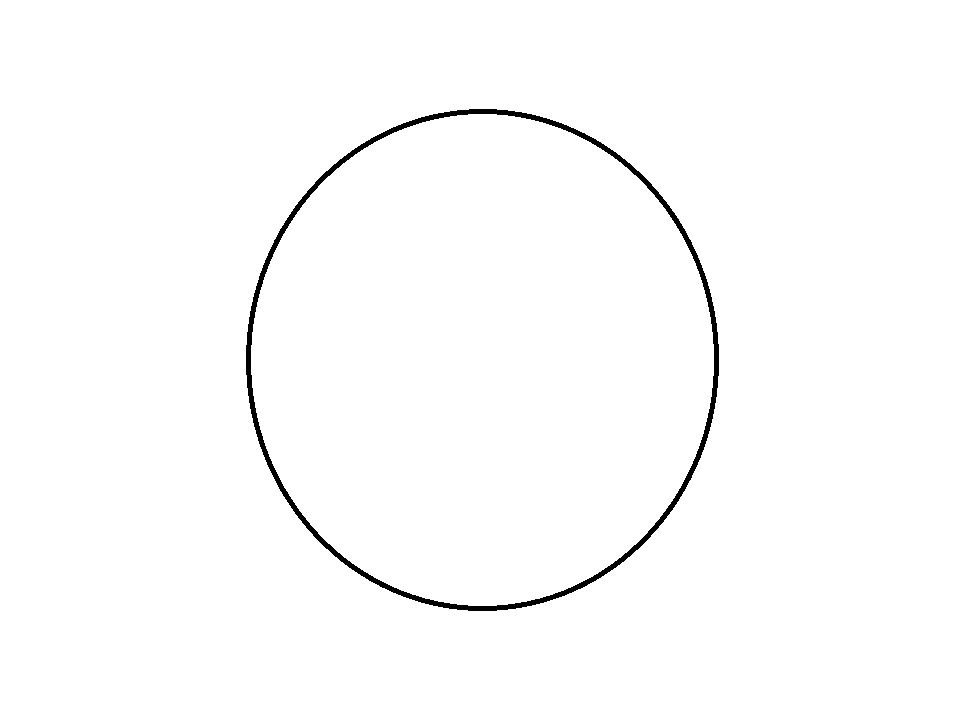
A one dimension torus, a circle.

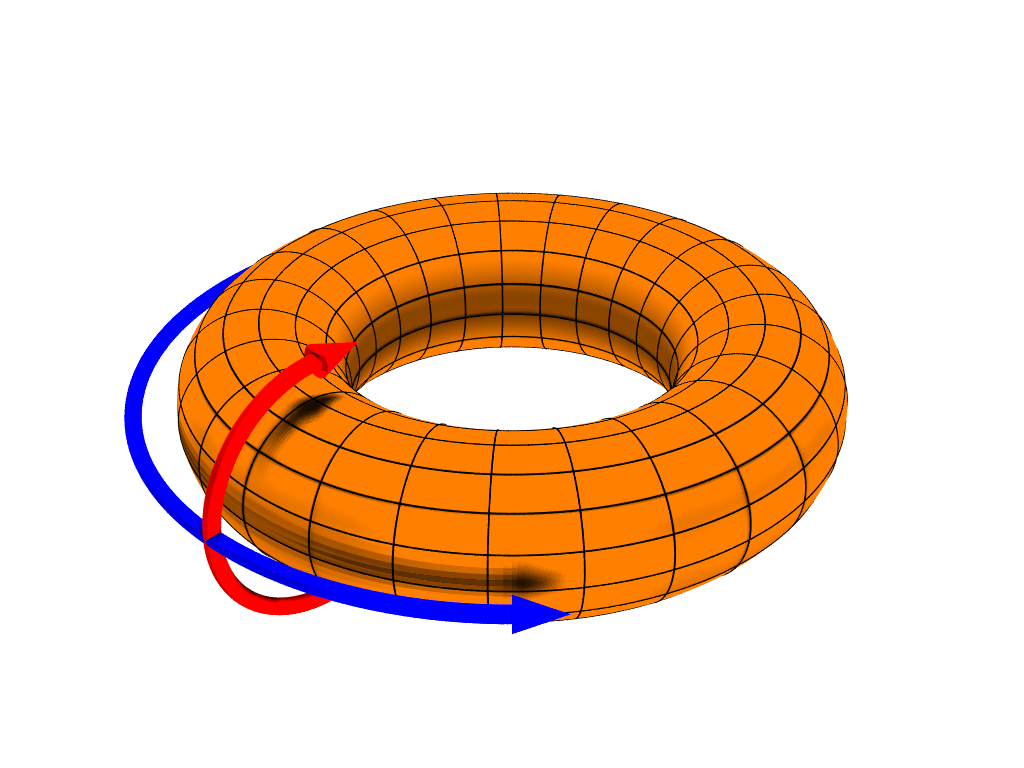
A two dimension torus, a donut.

Generating a two dimension torus from a two dimension rectangle.

=== Torus network topology ===
A torus interconnect is a switch-less topology that can be seen as a mesh interconnect with nodes arranged in a rectilinear array of N = 2, 3, or more dimensions, with processors connected to their nearest neighbors, and corresponding processors on opposite edges of the array connected.[1] In this lattice, each node has 2N connections. This topology is named for the lattice formed in this way, which is topologically homogeneous to an N-dimensional torus.

== Visualization ==
The first 3 dimensions of torus network topology are easier to visualize and are described below:

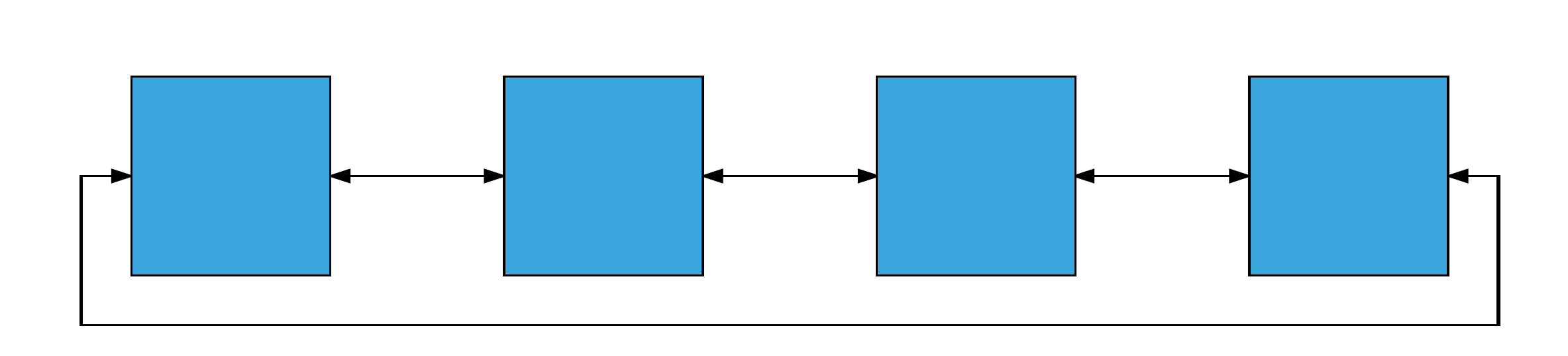
1D Torus illustration

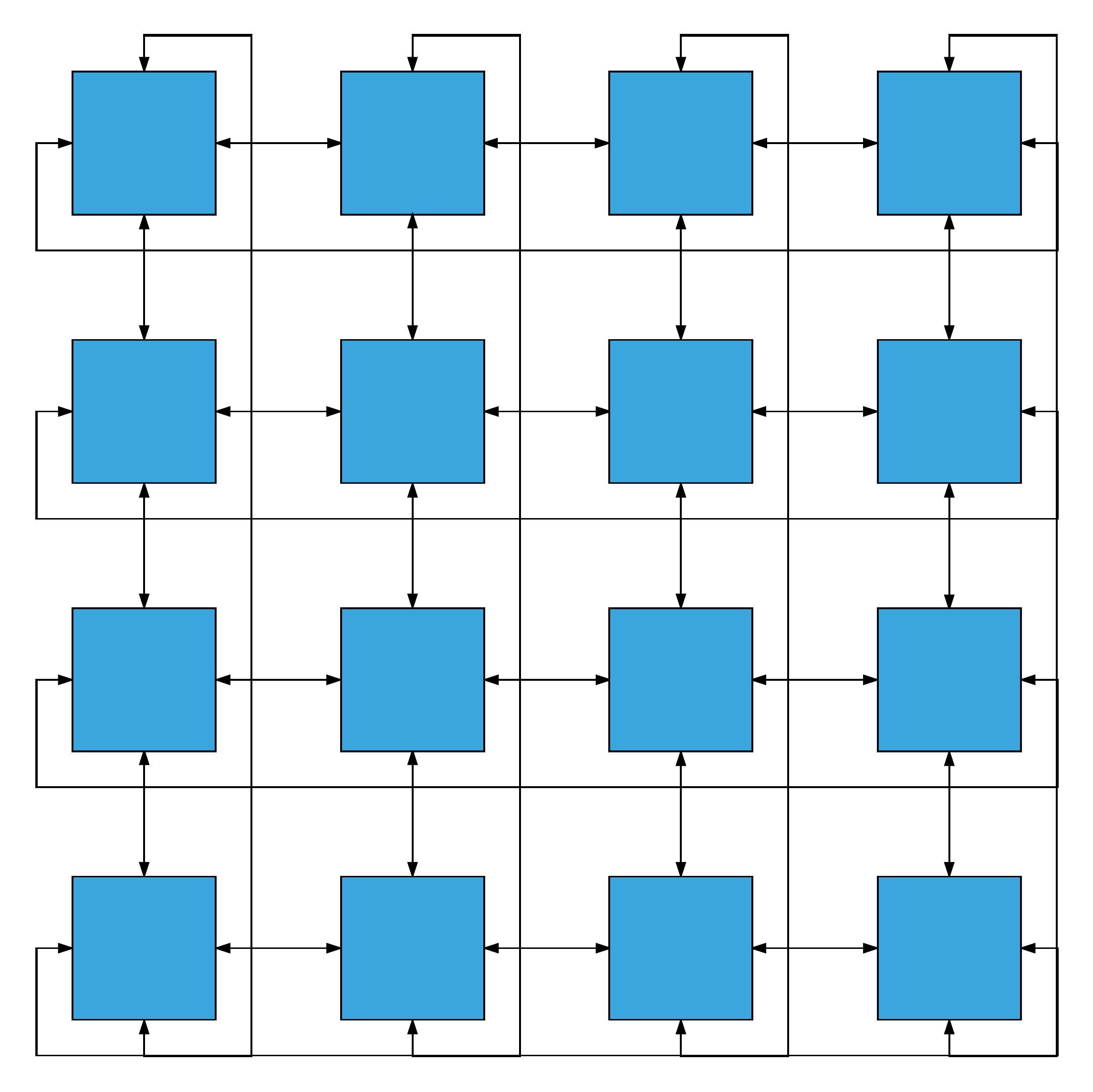
2D Torus illustration

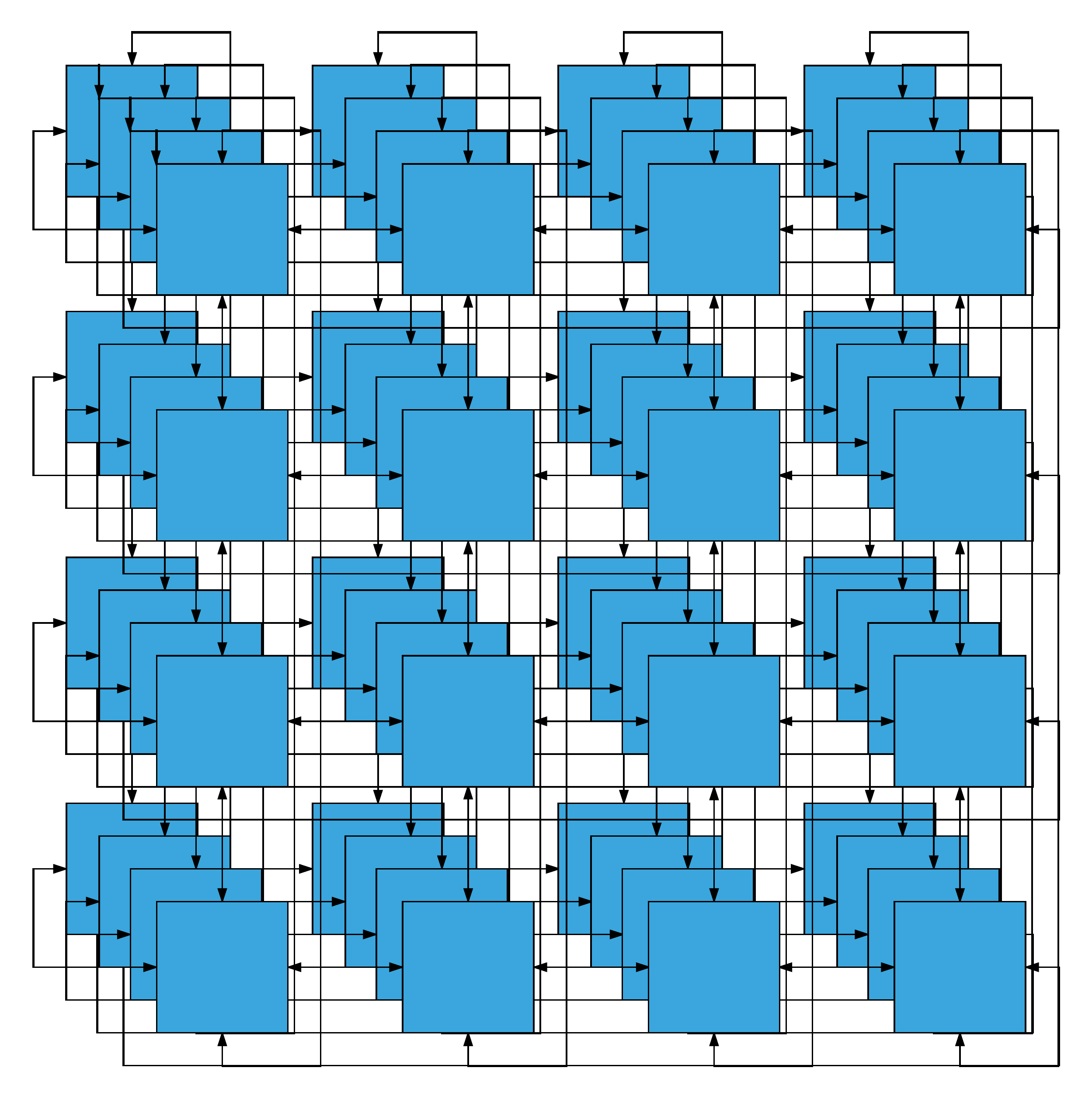
3D Torus illustration
- 1D Torus: one dimension, n nodes are connected in closed loop with each node connected to its two nearest neighbors. Communication can take place in two directions, +x and −x. A 1D Torus is the same as ring interconnection.
- 2D Torus: two dimensions with degree of four, the nodes are imagined laid out in a two-dimensional rectangular lattice of n rows and n columns, with each node connected to its four nearest neighbors, and corresponding nodes on opposite edges connected. Communication can take place in four directions, +x, −x, +y, and −y. The total nodes of a 2D Torus is n^{2}.
- 3D Torus: three dimensions, the nodes are imagined in a three-dimensional lattice in the shape of a rectangular prism, with each node connected with its six neighbors, with corresponding nodes on opposing faces of the array connected. Each edge consists of n nodes. communication can take place in six directions, +x, −x, +y, −y, +z, −z. Each edge of a 3D Torus consist of n nodes. The total nodes of 3D Torus is n^{3}.
- ND Torus: N dimensions, each node of an N dimension torus has 2N neighbors, Communication can take place in 2N directions. Each edge consists of n nodes. Total nodes of this torus is n^{N}. The main motivation of having higher dimension of torus is to achieve higher bandwidth, lower latency, and higher scalability.

Higher-dimensional arrays are difficult to visualize. The above ruleset shows that each higher dimension adds another pair of nearest neighbor connections to each node.

== Performance ==
A number of supercomputers on the TOP500 list use three-dimensional torus networks, e.g. IBM's Blue Gene/L and Blue Gene/P, and the Cray XT3. IBM's Blue Gene/Q uses a five-dimensional torus network. Fujitsu's K computer and the PRIMEHPC FX10 use a proprietary three-dimensional torus 3D mesh interconnect called Tofu.

=== 3D Torus performance simulation ===
Sandeep Palur and Dr. Ioan Raicu from Illinois Institute of Technology conducted experiments to simulate 3D torus performance. Their experiments ran on a computer with 250GB RAM, 48 cores and x86_64 architecture. The simulator they used was ROSS (Rensselaer’s Optimistic Simulation System). They mainly focused on three aspects:

- Varying network size
- Varying number of servers
- Varying message size

They concluded that throughput decreases with the increase of servers and network size. Otherwise, throughput increases with the increase of message size.

=== 6D Torus product performance ===
Fujitsu Limited developed a 6D torus computer model called "Tofu". In their model, a 6D torus can achieve 100 GB/s off-chip bandwidth, 12 times higher scalability than a 3D torus, and high fault tolerance. The model is used in the K computer and Fugaku.

=== Cost ===
While long wrap-around links may be the easiest way to visualize the connection topology, in practice, restrictions on cable lengths often make long wrap-around links impractical. Instead, directly connected nodes—including nodes that the above visualization places on opposite edges of a grid, connected by a long wrap-around link—are physically placed nearly adjacent to each other in a folded torus network. Every link in the folded torus network is very short—almost as short as the nearest-neighbor links in a simple grid interconnect—and therefore low-latency.

== See also ==
- Computer cluster
- Heartbeat private network
- Switched fabric
