= Keith Diefendorff =

- Known for: PowerPC

Keith Diefendorff is a computer architect and veteran in the microprocessor industry.

Diefendorff is one of the persons that has led the industry in developing RISC processors, both for embedded systems and superscalar high performance systems. He is one of the main designers of the PowerPC family of processors.

== Background ==
Keith Diefendorff started at Texas Instruments, designing integrated circuits processors and systems. Later Diefendorff joined Motorola and was the chief architect of a second-generation implementation of the 88000 instruction set architecture, the 88110. The 88110 was not a commercial success, and when Motorola shifted focus to creating a new RISC architecture with IBM, Diefendorff was assigned as chief architect for the PowerPC.

After his work at Motorola Diefendorff moved to NexGen as director of technical x86-strategy. Diefendorff joined AMD when NexGen was acquired by AMD.

From AMD Diefendorff then moved to Apple as architect for the AltiVec media extensions developed for the PowerPC processors used by Apple.

Keith Diefendorff has been working in the embedded processor space. First at the embedded processor IP-core company ARC International. After ARC Diefendorff moved to MIPS Technologies.

Diefendorff has also worked as processor analyst, and editor in chief (1998–2001) for the industry magazine Microprocessor Report.

I'm not sure competition from any company is Intel's biggest problem. A bigger problem is generating demand for its faster, more profitable desktop chips...

— Keith Diefendorff on the main threats to Intel
