= Qoscos Grid =

Supercomputing system

The QosCosGrid is a quasi-opportunistic supercomputing system using grid computing.

QosCosGrid acts as middleware resource management facilities which provide end-users with supercomputer-like performance by connecting many computing clusters together. By using QosCosGrid large-scale computing models in existing programming languages such as Fortran or C can be distributed among multiple computing resources.

== See also ==
- BOINC
