= Fujitsu A64FX =

Microprocessor designed by Fujitsu

A64FX
General information
- Launched: 2019
- Marketed by: Fujitsu
- Designed by: Fujitsu
- Common manufacturer: TSMC

Physical specifications
- Transistors: ~8.786 billion
- Cores: 48 per CPU plus optional assistant cores

Architecture and classification
- Technology node: 7 nm
- Microarchitecture: In-house
- Instruction set: ARMv8.2-A with SVE and SBSA level 3

History
- Predecessor: SPARC64 XIfx

The A64FX is a 64-bit ARM architecture microprocessor designed by Fujitsu. The processor is replacing the SPARC64 XIfx as Fujitsu's processor for supercomputer applications. It powers the Fugaku supercomputer, the fastest TOP500 supercomputer in the world between the June of both 2020 and 2022, being first surpassed by the Frontier.

== Design ==
The A64FX implements the ARMv8.2-A instruction set, with 512-bit Scalable Vector Extension (SVE) SIMD units. The SVE accepts four operands, one more than typical 3-operand machines; the extra operand is called the instruction prefix. For example, MOVPRFX instruction followed by (ARM, like RISC in general, is a 3-operand machine, with no space for four operands), which get packed into a single operation in the pipeline. For the processor the designer claim ">90% execution efficiency in (D|S|H)GEMM and INT16/8 dot product".

The processor uses 32 gigabytes of HBM2 memory with a bandwidth of 1 TB per second. The processor contains 16 PCIe 3.0 lanes for solid state NVMe storage. The processor also integrates a TofuD fabric controller with 10 ports implemented as 20 lanes of high-speed 28 Gbit/s to connect multiple nodes in a cluster. The reported transistor count is about 8.786 billion.

Each A64FX processor has four NUMA nodes, with each NUMA node having 12 compute cores, for a total of 48 cores per processor. Each NUMA node has its own level 2 cache, HBM2 memory, and assistant cores for non-computational purposes.

Fujitsu intends to produce lower specification machines with reduced assistant cores. Reliability, availability and serviceability (RAS) capabilities are claimed, i.e. ~128,400 error checkers in total.

In June 2020 the Fugaku supercomputer using this processor reached 442 petaFLOPS and became the fastest supercomputer in the world.

== Implementations ==
Fujitsu designed the A64FX for the Fugaku. Fugaku held the rank of the fastest supercomputer in the world by TOP500 rankings. Fujitsu intends to sell smaller machines with A64FX processors. Anandtech reported in June 2020 that the cost of a PRIMEHPC FX700 server, with two A64FX nodes, was ¥4,155,330 (c. US$39,000).

Cray is developing supercomputers using the A64FX. The Isambard 2 supercomputer is being built for a consortium in the United Kingdom, led by the University of Bristol and also including the Met Office, using the Fujitsu processors. It is an upgrade to the Isambard supercomputer which was built with the Marvell ThunderX2, another ARM architecture microprocessor.

Ookami is an open testbed system supported by NSF run by Stony Brook University and the University at Buffalo providing researchers access to A64FX processors.

== See also ==
- Comparison of ARMv8-A cores
- ThunderX2 – another ARM architecture high performance computing microprocessor
- Huawei Kunpeng 920 – also an ARM high-performance microprocessor, but developed by the Huawei-owned HiSilicon. Only available in China.
