= Torus fusion =

Torus fusion (tofu) is a proprietary computer network topology for supercomputers developed by Fujitsu. It is a variant of the torus interconnect. The system has been used in the K computer and the Fugaku supercomputer (and their derivatives).

Tofu has a six-dimensional mesh/torus topology, a scalability of over 100,000 nodes, and full-duplex links that have a peak bandwidth of 10 GB/s (5 GB/s per direction). Each node is connected to its own InterConnect Controller (ICC) chip, which contains four Tofu interfaces (one for the node and three for connecting to other ICC chips) and a router.

== Software support ==
Tofu's six-dimensional mesh/torus topology is abstracted by software to appear as a three-dimensional torus; it is supported by a Tofu-optimized version of the open-source Open MPI Message Passing Interface library. Users can create application programs adapted to either a one-, two-, or three-dimensional torus network.

== See also ==
- Torus interconnect
- K computer
- Fugaku (supercomputer)
