= Fugaku (supercomputer) =

Japanese supercomputer

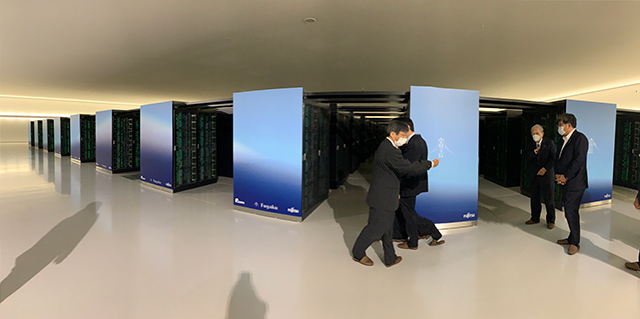
- Supercomputer Fugaku
- Active: From 2021
- Sponsors: MEXT
- Operators: Riken
- Location: Riken Center for Computational Science (R-CCS)
- Architecture: 158,976 nodes; Fujitsu A64FX CPU (48+4 core) per node; Tofu interconnect D
- Operating system: Custom Linux-based kernel
- Memory: HBM2 32 GiB/node
- Storage: 1.6 TB NVMe SSD/16 nodes (L1); 150 PB shared Lustre FS (L2); Cloud storage services (L3)
- Speed: 442 PFLOPS (per TOP500 Rmax), after upgrade; higher 2.0 EFLOPS on a different mixed-precision benchmark
- Cost: US$1 billion (total programme cost)
- Ranking: TOP500: 7, June 2025
- Purpose: Scientific research
- Legacy: TOP500: 1, June 2020 – June 2022
- Website: www.r-ccs.riken.jp/en/fugaku
- Sources: Fugaku System Configuration

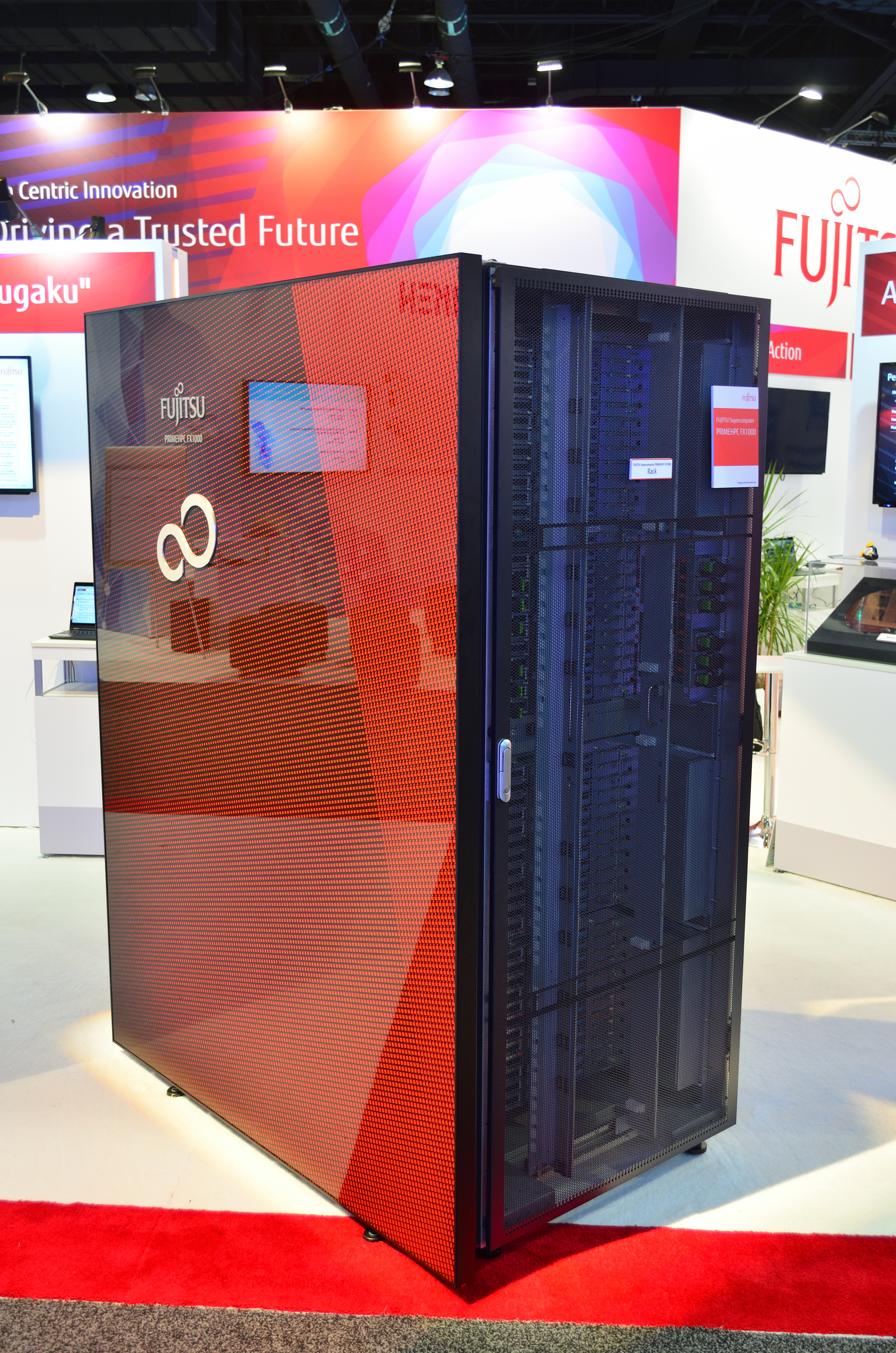
PRIMEHPC FX1000 (Fugaku node) at SC19

Fugaku (Japanese: 富岳) is a petascale supercomputer at the Riken Center for Computational Science in Kobe, Japan. It started development in 2014 as the successor to the K computer and made its debut in 2020. It is named after an alternative name for Mount Fuji.

It became the fastest supercomputer in the world in the June 2020 TOP500 list as well as becoming the first ARM architecture-based computer to achieve this. At this time it also achieved 1.42 exaFLOPS using the mixed fp16/fp64 precision HPL-AI benchmark. It started regular operations in 2021.

Fugaku was superseded as the fastest supercomputer in the world by Frontier in May 2022.

== Hardware ==
The supercomputer is built with the Fujitsu A64FX microprocessor. This CPU is based on the ARM version 8.2A processor architecture, and adopts the Scalable Vector Extensions for supercomputers. Fugaku was aimed to be about 100 times more powerful than the K computer (i.e. a performance target of 1 exaFLOPS).

The initial (June 2020) configuration of Fugaku used 158,976 A64FX CPUs joined using Fujitsu's proprietary torus fusion interconnect. An upgrade in November 2020 increased the number of processors.

== Software ==
Fugaku uses a "light-weight multi-kernel operating system" named IHK/McKernel. The operating system uses both Linux and the McKernel light-weight kernel operating simultaneously and side by side. The infrastructure that both kernels run on is termed the Interface for Heterogeneous Kernels (IHK). The high-performance simulations are run on McKernel, with Linux available for all other POSIX-compatible services.

Fugaku uses a three-tiered storage system to provide parallel storage to the compute nodes. The first-level LLIO storage is an NVM-based file I/O accelerator co-developed by Fujitsu and RIKEN that is allocated on per-job storage basis to the compute nodes for storing temporary data with low latency. The LLIO system stages data in and out of a second-level Fujitsu Exascale File System (FEFS), which uses disk-based storage based on Lustre software to provide a large persistent high-performance filesystem, and a tape-based archive to store a large volume of infrequently accessed data.

Besides the system software, the supercomputer has run many kinds of applications, including several benchmarks. Running the mainstream HPL benchmark, used by TOP500, Fugaku is at petascale and almost halfway to exascale. Additionally, Fugaku has set world records on at least three other benchmarks, including HPL-AI; at 2.0 exaflops, the system has exceeded the exascale threshold for the benchmark. A description of that benchmark is as follows:

The solver method of choice is a combination of LU factorization and iterative refinement performed afterwards to bring the solution back to 64-bit accuracy. The innovation of HPL-AI lies in dropping the requirement of 64-bit computation throughout the entire solution process and instead opting for low-precision (likely 16-bit) accuracy for LU, and a sophisticated iteration to recover the accuracy lost in factorization.

== Performance ==
The reported initial performance of Fugaku was a Rmax of 416 petaFLOPS in the FP64 high performance LINPACK benchmark used by the TOP500. After the November 2020 upgrade in the number of processors, Fugaku's performance increased to a Rmax of 442 petaFLOPS.

In 2020, Fugaku also attained top spots in other rankings that test computers on different workloads, including Graph500, HPL-AI, and HPCG benchmark. No previous supercomputer has ever led all four rankings at once.

After a hardware upgrade, as of November 2020, "Fugaku increased its performance on the new mixed precision HPC-AI benchmark to 2.0 exaflops, besting its 1.4 exaflops mark recorded six months ago. These represent the first benchmark measurements above one exaflop for any precision on any type of hardware." (a 42% increase) Interestingly, the Arm A64FX core-count was only increased by 4.5%, to 7,630,848, but the measured performance rose much more on that benchmark (and the system does not use other compute capabilities, such as GPUs), and a little more on TOP500, or by 6.4%, to 442 petaflops, a new world record and widening the gap to the next computer by that much. For the HPCG benchmark, it is 5.4 times faster, at 16.0 HPCG-petaflops, than the number two system, Summit, which happens to also be second on TOP500.

As of November 2020, Fugaku's performance surpassed the combined performance of the next 4 supercomputers on the TOP500 list, and surpassed the remaining top-10 computers on the HPCG benchmark by a margin of 45%.

By June 2026, Fugaku had dropped to 9th place on the TOP500 list. Beating the 10th place system, Alps, by 8 petaflops.

== History ==
On May 23, 2019, Riken announced that the supercomputer was to be named Fugaku. In August 2019, the logo for Fugaku was unveiled; it depicts Mount Fuji, symbolising "Fugaku's high performance" and "the wide range of its users". In November 2019, the prototype of Fugaku won first place in the Green500 list. Shipment of the equipment racks to the Riken facility began on December 2, 2019, and was completed on May 13, 2020. In June 2020, Fugaku became the fastest supercomputer in the world in the TOP500 list, displacing the IBM Summit.

Fugaku has been used for research on masks related to the COVID-19 pandemic.

In May 2024, a Japanese research team released Fugaku-LLM, a 13-billion-parameter large language model with enhanced Japanese language capability that was trained on Fugaku. The project ported Megatron-DeepSpeed to Fugaku and optimized Transformer training on its CPU-based architecture.

== Cost ==
In 2018, Nikkei reported the programme would cost ¥130 billion (c. US$1 billion).

== Comparison ==
Performance and cost comparison chart against computers ranked #1 in TOP500
Name	Start year	End year	Performance (PFLOPS) (Note: This is based on the TOP500 Rmax measurement using the LINPACK benchmark at FP64 precision.)	Cost (million USD) _{(not inflation adjusted)}	TOP500 ranking	CPU/GPU vendor	CPU	OS
Fugaku	2020	—	442	1213 (Note: This is the total programme cost involving the creation of the technologies, rather than just for the machine.)	June 2020 to November 2021 1st	Fujitsu	A64FX	Linux (RedHat 8) and McKernel
Summit	2018	—	148	300	June 2018 to November 2019 1st	IBM, Nvidia	POWER9, Tesla	Linux (RedHat)
Sierra	2018	—	94	300	November 2018 to November 2019 2nd	IBM, Nvidia	POWER9, Tesla	Linux (RedHat)
Sunway TaihuLight	2016	—	93	280	June 2016 to November 2017 1st	NRCPC	Sunway SW26010	Linux (Raise)
K	2011	2019	10	1045	June 2011 – November 2011 1st	Fujitsu	SPARC64 VIIIfx	Linux

== See also ==
- ARM supercomputers
- Aurora (supercomputer)
- Frontier (supercomputer)
- List of fastest computers
- Summit (supercomputer)
- TOP500

Records
Preceded by IBM Summit; 148.6 petaFLOPS	World's most powerful supercomputer June 2020 – May 2022; 0.54 exaFLOPS	Succeeded by HPE Frontier; 1.1 exaFLOPS
