= Microprocessor Report =

- Publisher: TechInsights
- Founder: Michael Slater (engineer)
- Founded: 1987; 39 years ago
- Country: United States
- Based in: Mountain View, California
- Website: linleygroup.com/mpr/

Microprocessor Report is a newsletter covering the microprocessor industry. The publication is accessible only to paying subscribers. To avoid bias, it does not take advertisements.

The publication provides extensive analysis of new high-performance microprocessor chips. It also covers microprocessor design issues, microprocessor-based systems, memory and system logic chips, embedded processors, GPUs, DSPs, and intellectual property (IP) cores.

== History and profile ==
Microprocessor Report was first published in 1987 by Michael Slater (engineer). Original board members included Bruce Koball, George Morrow, Brian Case, John Wakerly, Nick Tredennick, Bernard Peuto, Rich Belgard, Dennis Allison, and J H Wharton all of whom served for many years. Slater left MicroDesign Resources (MDR), at the end of 1999.

Slater's company MDR, based in Sebastopol, California, originally published Microprocessor Report. MDR also hosted an annual conference, the Microprocessor Forum, and related events.

== Publication ==
Originally published monthly in print, in 2000 it began publishing weekly online and monthly in print.

Typical articles describe the internal design and feature set of microprocessors from vendors such as Intel, Broadcom, and Qualcomm. The articles usually compare the leading products and discuss their strengths and weaknesses. The annual "year in review" articles provide a broader look at the processor landscape. The publication gives annual awards to the best microprocessor products. Free summaries of these articles are available online.

During the 1990s, Microprocessor Report was recognized four times as Best Newsletter by the Computer Press Association, which noted its "comprehensive and in-depth coverage."

Slater wrote an account of the early years for the newsletter's tenth anniversary. Slater also recounted his career in an oral history at the Computer History Museum.

== Contributors ==
In addition to Slater, regular contributors have included Linley Gwennap, Keith Diefendorff, Steven Leibson, Markus Levy, Peter Glaskowsky, Kevin Krewell, Tom Halfhill, Jim McGregor, Max Baron, and James Sanders. The 2018 staff was led by editor-in-chief Gwennap with Bob Wheeler, Mike Demler, and Aakash Jani. Tom Halfhill retired in June 2020.

== Acquisition ==
In 1992, MDR was acquired by Ziff Davis.

In 1999, MDR was sold to Cahners Business Information (later Reed Business Information), where it became part of the analyst group In-Stat. During the 2000s, the staff of the newsletter declined. On 6 May 2010, Microprocessor Report was acquired by The Linley Group.

In October 2021, TechInsights acquired The Linley Group, gaining control of Microprocessor Report. In May of the following year, Joseph Byrne rejoined the publication's team, having been on staff until 2013. Byrne took over the editor-in-chief role at the end of 2022 and continued in that position until December 2023. Following that, David MacQueen became editor in chief.
