= Tianhe-1 =

Supercomputer

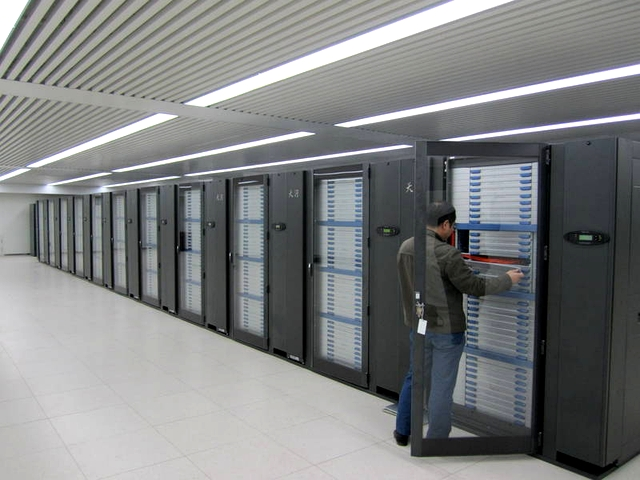
- Tianhe-1
- Active: Tianhe-1 Operational 29 October 2009, Tianhe-1A Operational 28 October 2010
- Sponsors: National University of Defense Technology
- Operators: National Supercomputing Center
- Location: National Supercomputing Center, Tianjin, People's Republic of China
- Operating system: Linux
- Memory: 96 TB (98304 GB) for Tianhe-1, 262 TB for Tianhe-1A
- Speed: Tianhe-1: 563 teraFLOPS (R_{max}) 1,206.2 teraFLOPS (R_{peak}), Tianhe-1A: 2,566.0 teraFLOPS (R_{max}) 4,701.0 teraFLOPS (R_{peak})
- Ranking: TOP500: 1st, November 2010 (Tianhe-1A)
- Purpose: Petroleum exploration, aircraft simulation
- Sources: top500.org

Tianhe-1
- Simplified Chinese: 天河一号
- Traditional Chinese: 天河一號
- Literal meaning: "Milky Way No.1"
Transcriptions
Standard Mandarin
- Hanyu Pinyin: Tiānhé yīhào

Tianhe-I, Tianhe-1, or TH-1 (Chinese: 天河一号, [tʰjɛ́nxɤ̌ íxâʊ]; Sky River Number One) is a supercomputer capable of an Rmax (maximum range) of 2.5 peta FLOPS. Located at the National Supercomputing Center of Tianjin, China, it was the fastest computer in the world from October 2010 to June 2011 and was one of the few petascale supercomputers in the world.

In October 2010, an upgraded version of the machine (Tianhe-1A) overtook ORNL's Jaguar to become the world's fastest supercomputer, with a peak computing rate of 2.57 petaFLOPS. In June 2011 the Tianhe-1A was overtaken by the K computer as the world's fastest supercomputer, which was also subsequently superseded.

Both the original Tianhe-1 and Tianhe-1A use a Linux-based operating system.

On 12 August 2015, Tianhe-1 felt the impact of the powerful Tianjin explosions and went offline for some time. Xinhua reports that "the office building of Chinese supercomputer Tianhe-1, one of the world's fastest supercomputers, suffered damage". Sources at Tianhe-1 told Xinhua that the computer was not damaged, but that they had shut down some of its operations as a precaution. Operation resumed on 17 August 2015.

== Background ==
=== Tianhe-1 ===
Tianhe-1 was developed by the Chinese National University of Defense Technology (NUDT) in Changsha, Hunan. It was first revealed to the public on 29 October 2009, and was immediately ranked as the world's fifth fastest supercomputer in the TOP500 list released at the 2009 Supercomputing Conference (SC09) held in Portland, Oregon, on 16 November 2009. Tianhe achieved a speed of 563 teraflops in its first Top 500 test and had a peak performance of 1.2 petaflops. Thus at startup, the system had an efficiency of 46%. Originally, Tianhe-1 was powered by 4,096 Intel Xeon E5540 processors and 1,024 Intel Xeon E5450 processors, with 5,120 AMD graphics processing units (GPUs), which were made up of 2,560 dual-GPU ATI Radeon HD 4870 X2 graphics cards.

=== Tianhe-1A ===
In October 2010, Tianhe-1A, an upgraded supercomputer, was unveiled at HPC 2010 China. It is now equipped with 14,336 Xeon X5670 processors and 7,168 Nvidia Tesla M2050 general purpose GPUs. 2,048 FeiTeng 1000 SPARC-based processors are also installed in the system, but their computing power was not counted into the machine's official LINPACK statistics as of October 2010. Tianhe-1A has a theoretical peak performance of 4.701 petaflops. NVIDIA suggests that it would have taken "50,000 CPUs and twice as much floor space to deliver the same performance using CPUs alone." The current heterogeneous system consumes 4.04 megawatts compared to over 12 megawatts had it been built only with CPUs.

The Tianhe-1A system is composed of 112 computer cabinets, 12 storage cabinets, 6 communications cabinets, and 8 I/O cabinets. Each computer cabinet is composed of four frames, with each frame containing eight blades, plus a 16-port switching board. Each blade is composed of two computer nodes, with each computer node containing two Xeon X5670 6-core processors and one Nvidia M2050 GPU processor. The system has 3584 total blades containing 7168 GPUs, and 14,336 CPUs, managed by the SLURM job scheduler. The total disk storage of the systems is 2 Petabytes implemented as a Lustre clustered file system, and the total memory size of the system is 262 terabytes.

Another significant reason for the increased performance of the upgraded Tianhe-1A system is the Chinese-designed NUDT custom designed proprietary high-speed interconnect called Arch that runs at 160 Gbit/s, twice the bandwidth of InfiniBand.

The system also used the Chinese-made FeiTeng-1000 central processing unit. The FeiTeng-1000 processor is used both on service nodes and to enhance the system interconnect.

The supercomputer is installed at the National Supercomputing Center, Tianjin, and is used to carry out computations for petroleum exploration and aircraft design. It is an "open access" computer, meaning it provides services for other countries. The supercomputer will be available to international clients.

The computer cost $88 million to build. Approximately $20 million is spent annually for electricity and operating expenses. Approximately 200 workers are employed in its operation.

Tianhe-IA was ranked as the world's fastest supercomputer in the TOP500 list until July 2011 when the K computer overtook it.

In June 2011, scientists at the Institute of Process Engineering (IPE) at the Chinese Academy of Sciences (CAS) announced a record-breaking scientific simulation on the Tianhe-1A supercomputer that furthers their research in solar energy. CAS-IPE scientists ran a complex molecular dynamics simulation on all 7,168 NVIDIA Tesla GPUs to achieve a performance of 1.87 petaflops (about the same performance as 130,000 laptops).

The Tianhe-1A supercomputer was shut down after the National Supercomputing Center of Tianjin was damaged by an explosion nearby. The computer was not damaged and still remains operational.

== See also ==
- HPC Challenge Benchmark
- Supercomputing in China
- Tianhe-2

Records
Preceded by Jaguar; 1.75 petaflops	World's most powerful supercomputer October 2010 – June 2011	Succeeded by K computer 8.2 petaflops
