= K computer =

Supercomputer in Kobe, Japan

Coordinates: 34°39′12.1″N 135°13′13.7″E

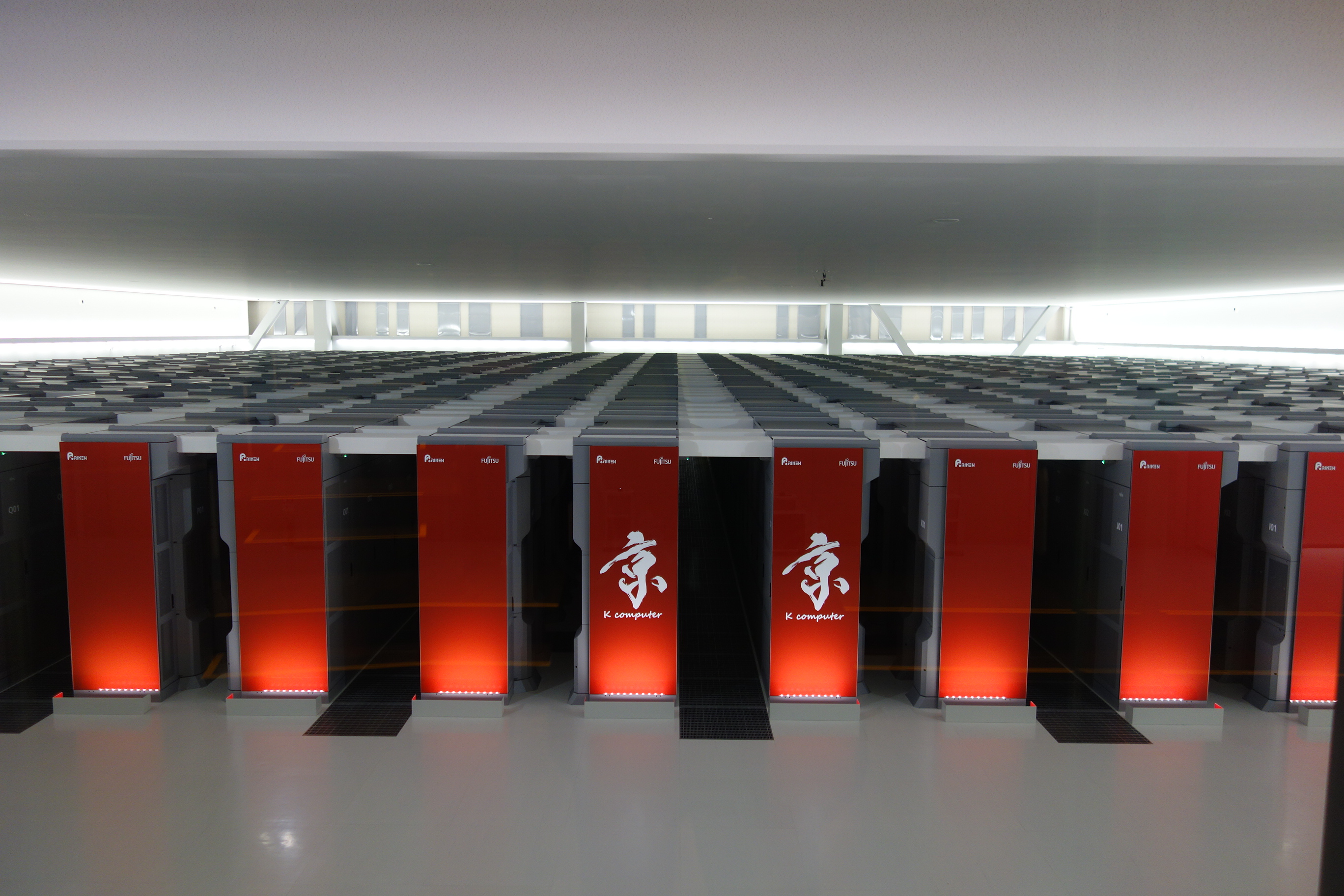
- Active: June 2011 – August 2019
- Sponsors: MEXT, Japan
- Operators: Fujitsu
- Location: Riken Advanced Institute for Computational Science
- Architecture: 88,128 SPARC64 VIIIfx processors, Tofu interconnect
- Power: 12.6 MW
- Operating system: Linux
- Speed: 10.51 petaflops (Rmax)
- Ranking: TOP500: 18th, as of November 2018

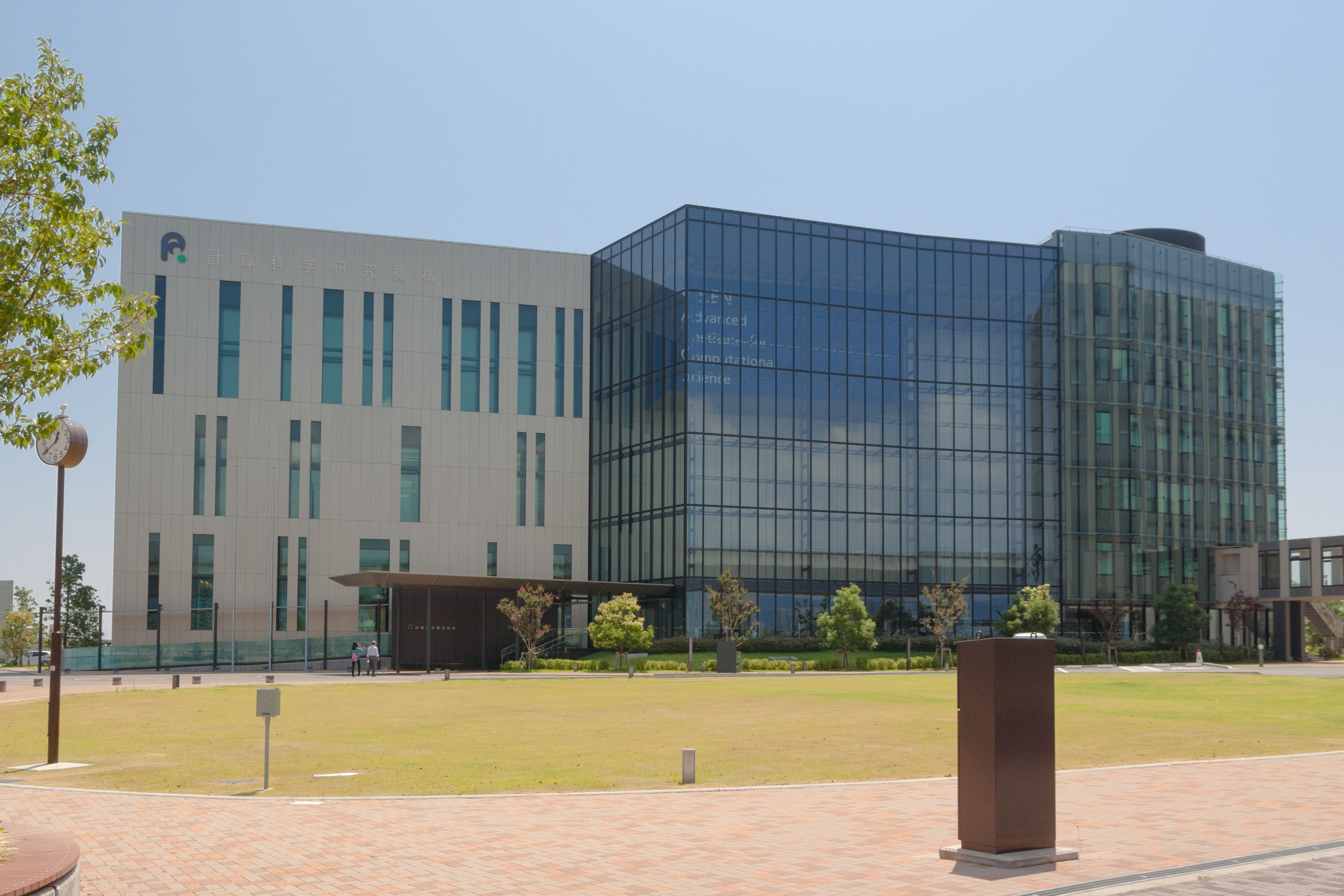
Riken Advanced Institute for Computational Science (AICS) in Kobe, which housed the K computer

The K computer – named for the Japanese word/numeral "kei" (京), meaning 10 quadrillion (10^{16}) (Note: See Japanese numbers) – was a supercomputer manufactured by Fujitsu, installed at the Riken Advanced Institute for Computational Science campus in Kobe, Hyōgo Prefecture, Japan. The K computer was based on a distributed memory architecture with over 80,000 compute nodes. It was used for a variety of applications, including climate research, disaster prevention and medical research. The K computer's operating system was based on the Linux kernel, with additional drivers designed to make use of the computer's hardware.

In June 2011, TOP500 ranked K the world's fastest supercomputer, with a computation speed of over 8 petaflops, and in November 2011, K became the first computer to top 10 petaflops. It had originally been slated for completion in June 2012. In June 2012, K was superseded as the world's fastest supercomputer by the American IBM Sequoia.

As of November 2018, the K computer held third place for the HPCG benchmark. It held the first place until June 2018, when it was superseded by Summit and Sierra.

The K supercomputer was decommissioned on 30 August 2019. In Japan, the K computer was succeeded by the Fugaku supercomputer, in 2020, which took the top spot on the June 2020 TOP500 list, at that time nearly three times faster than second most powerful supercomputer.

== Performance ==
On 20 June 2011, the TOP500 Project Committee announced that K had set a LINPACK record with a performance of 8.162 petaflops, making it the fastest supercomputer in the world at the time; it achieved this performance with a computing efficiency ratio of 93.0%. The previous record holder was the Chinese National University of Defense Technology's Tianhe-1A, which performed at 2.507 petaflops. The TOP500 list is revised semiannually, and the rankings change frequently, indicating the speed at which computing power is increasing. In November 2011, Riken reported that K had become the first supercomputer to exceed 10 petaflops, achieving a LINPACK performance of 10.51 quadrillion computations per second with a computing efficiency ratio of 93.2%. K received top ranking in all four performance benchmarks at the 2011 HPC Challenge Awards.

On 18 June 2012, the TOP500 Project Committee announced that the California-based IBM Sequoia supercomputer replaced K as the world's fastest supercomputer, with a LINPACK performance of 16.325 petaflops. Sequoia is 55% faster than K, using 123% more CPU processors, but is also 150% more energy efficient.

On the TOP500 list, it became first in June 2011, falling down through time to lower positions, to eighteenth in November 2018.

K computer held third place in the HPCG benchmark test proposed by Jack Dongarra, with 0.6027 HPCG PFLOPS in November 2018.

== Specifications ==
=== Node architecture ===
The K computer comprised 88,128 2.0 GHz eight-core SPARC64 VIIIfx processors contained in 864 cabinets, for a total of 705,024 cores, manufactured by Fujitsu with 45 nm CMOS technology. Each cabinet contained 96 computing nodes, in addition to six I/O nodes. Each computing node contained a single processor and 16 GB of memory. The computer's water cooling system was designed to minimize failure rate and power consumption.

=== Network ===
The nodes were connected by Fujitsu's proprietary torus fusion (Tofu) interconnect.

=== File system ===
The system adopted a two-level local/global file system with parallel/distributed functions, and provided users with an automatic staging function for moving files between global and local file systems. Fujitsu developed an optimized parallel file system based on Lustre, called the Fujitsu Exabyte File System (FEFS), which is scalable to several hundred petabytes.

=== Power consumption ===
Although the K computer reported the highest total power consumption (9.89 MW – the equivalent of almost 10,000 suburban homes) on the June 2011 TOP500 list, it is relatively efficient, achieving 824.6 GFlop/kW. This is 29.8% more efficient than China's NUDT TH MPP (ranked #2 in 2011), and 225.8% more efficient than Oak Ridge's Jaguar-Cray XT5-HE (ranked #3 in 2011). However, K's power efficiency still fell far short of the 2097.2 GFlops/kWatt supercomputer record set by IBM's NNSA/SC Blue Gene/Q Prototype 2. For comparison, the average power consumption of a TOP 10 system in 2011 was 4.3 MW, and the average efficiency was 463.7 GFlop/kW.

According to TOP500 compiler Jack Dongarra, professor of electrical engineering and computer science at the University of Tennessee, the K computer's performance equaled "one million linked desktop computers". The computer's annual running costs were estimated at US$10 million.

== K Computer Mae rapid transit station ==
On 1 July 2011, Kobe's Port Island Line rapid transit system renamed one of its stations from "Port Island Minami" to "K Computer Mae" (meaning "In front of K Computer") denoting its vicinity. In June 2021, after the decommissioning of K computer, the station was renamed as Keisan Kagaku Center Station.

== See also ==
- PRIMEHPC FX10
- Supercomputing in Japan
- Graph500

== Notes ==
Records
Preceded by Tianhe-1; 2.566 petaflops	World's most powerful supercomputer June 2011 – June 2012	Succeeded by IBM Sequoia; 16.325 petaflops
