= List of the top supercomputers in the United States =

This is a list of the top supercomputers in the United States.

== List ==
Top Supercomputers in the United States
| World Rank | Name | Site | Manufacturer | Total Cores | Accelerator/ Co-Processor Cores | Rmax [TFlop/s] | Power (kW) | Operating System | CPU Processor | GPU Accelerator/Co-Processor |
|---|---|---|---|---|---|---|---|---|---|---|
| 1 | El Capitan | DOE/NNSA/LLNL | HPE | 11,039,616 | 9,988,224 | 1,742,000 | 29,581 | TOSS | AMD Zen-4 (Genoa) | AMD Instinct MI300A |
| 2 | Frontier | DOE/SC/Oak Ridge National Laboratory | Hewlett Packard Enterprise (HPE) | 9,066,176 | 8,451,520 | 1,353,000 | 24,607 | HPE Cray OS | AMD Zen-3 (Milan) | AMD Instinct MI250X |
| 3 | Aurora | DOE/SC/Argonne National Laboratory | Intel | 9,264,128 | 8,159,232 | 1,012,000 | 38,698 | SUSE Linux Enterprise Server 15 SP4 | Intel Sapphire Rapids | Intel Data Center GPU Max |
| 5 | Eagle | Microsoft Azure | Microsoft Azure | 2,073,600 | 1,900,800 | 561,200 | | Ubuntu 22.04 | Intel Sapphire Rapids | NVIDIA H100 |
| 12 | Tuolumne | DOE/NNSA/LLNL | HPE | 1,161,216 | 1,050,624 | 208,100 | 3,387 | TOSS | AMD Zen-4 (Genoa) | AMD Instinct MI300A |
| 16 | Eos NVIDIA DGX SuperPOD | NVIDIA Corporation | Nvidia | 485,888 | 439,296 | 121,400 | | Ubuntu 22.04.3 LTS | Intel Sapphire Rapids | NVIDIA H100 SXM5 80GB |
| 17 | Discovery 6 | ExxonMobil | HPE | 822,528 | 532,224 | 118,600 | | HPE Cray OS | NVIDIA Grace CPU | NVIDIA GH200 Superchip |
| 19 | Venado | DOE/NNSA/LANL | HPE | 481,440 | 311,520 | 98,510 | 1,662 | Linux | NVIDIA Grace CPU | NVIDIA GH200 Superchip |
| 20 | Sierra | DOE/NNSA/LLNL | IBM / NVIDIA / Mellanox | 1,572,480 | 1,382,400 | 94,640 | 7,438 | Red Hat Enterprise Linux | Power | NVIDIA Volta GV100 |
| 25 | Perlmutter | DOE/SC/LBNL/NERSC | HPE | 888,832 | 774,144 | 79,230 | 2,945 | HPE Cray OS | AMD Zen-3 (Milan) | NVIDIA A100 SXM4 40 GB |
| 28 | El Dorado | Sandia National Laboratories | HPE | 383,040 | 346,560 | 68,020 | 1,110 | TOSS | AMD Zen-4 (Genoa) | AMD Instinct MI300A |
| 30 | Selene | NVIDIA Corporation | Nvidia | 555,520 | 483,840 | 63,460 | 2,646 | Ubuntu 20.04.1 LTS | AMD Zen-2 (Rome) | NVIDIA A100 |
| 34 | Explorer-WUS3 | Microsoft Azure | Microsoft Azure | 445,440 | 422,400 | 53,960 | | Ubuntu 20.04 | AMD Zen-2 (Rome) | AMD Instinct MI250X |
| 42 | Reindeer | Microsoft Azure | Microsoft Azure | 138,240 | 126,720 | 45,590 | | Ubuntu 22.04 | Intel Sapphire Rapids | NVIDIA H200 |
| 56 | Voyager-EUS2 | Microsoft Azure | Microsoft Azure | 253,440 | 228,096 | 30,050 | | Ubuntu 18.04 LTS | AMD Zen-2 (Rome) | NVIDIA Tesla A100 80G |
| 57 | Crossroads | DOE/NNSA/LANL/SNL | HPE | 660,800 | | 30,035 | 6,284 | HPE Cray OS | Intel Sapphire Rapids | |
| 60 | Discovery 5 | ExxonMobil | HPE | 232,000 | 216,000 | 26,130 | 964 | HPE Cray OS | AMD Zen-3 (Milan) | NVIDIA A100 SXM4 40 GB |
| 61 | Polaris | DOE/SC/Argonne National Laboratory | HPE | 256,592 | 238,896 | 25,810 | | SLES15 SP2 | AMD Zen-2 (Rome) | NVIDIA A100 SXM4 40 GB |
| 64 | rzAdams | DOE/NNSA/LLNL | HPE | 129,024 | 116,736 | 24,380 | 388 | TOSS | AMD Zen-4 (Genoa) | AMD Instinct MI300A |
| 65 | Portage | Hewlett Packard Enterprise | HPE | 129,024 | 116,736 | 24,100 | 371 | RHEL 8.9 | AMD Zen-4 (Genoa) | AMD Instinct MI300A |
| 67 | Frontera | Texas Advanced Computing Center/University of Texas | DELL | 448,448 | | 23,516 | | CentOS Linux 7 | Intel Cascade Lake | |
| 68 | Yep1 | Ahrefs US DC | Nvidia | 73,584 | 66,528 | 23,320 | | Ubuntu 22.04.3 LTS | Intel Sapphire Rapids | NVIDIA H100 SXM5 80GB |
| 69 | BioHive-2 | Recursion | Nvidia | 40,320 | 33,264 | 23,320 | | Ubuntu 22.04 | Intel Sapphire Rapids | NVIDIA H100 |
| 76 | BofA Supercomputer | Bank of America | HPE | 71,680 | 67,584 | 21,460 | | Ubuntu 22.04 | Intel Sapphire Rapids | NVIDIA H100 SXM5 80GB |
| 84 | Frontier TDS | DOE/SC/Oak Ridge National Laboratory | HPE | 120,832 | 112,640 | 19,200 | 309 | HPE Cray OS | AMD Zen-3 (Milan) | AMD Instinct MI250X |
| 87 | Kestrel GPU | National Renewable Energy Laboratory | HPE | 83,968 | 67,584 | 18,400 | | RHEL 6.8 | AMD Zen-4 (Genoa) | NVIDIA H100 80GB |
| 88 | Lassen | DOE/NNSA/LLNL | IBM / NVIDIA / Mellanox | 288,288 | 253,440 | 18,200 | | Red Hat Enterprise Linux | Power | NVIDIA Tesla V100 |
| 89 | DeltaAI | NCSA/Illinois Urbana-Champaign | HPE | 124,032 | 80,256 | 18,080 | 372 | SLES 15 SP5 | NVIDIA Grace CPU | NVIDIA GH200 Superchip |
| 94 | HiPerGator AI | University of Florida | Nvidia | 138,880 | 120,960 | 17,200 | 583 | Ubuntu 20.04.2 LTS | AMD Zen-2 (Rome) | NVIDIA A100 |
| 97 | Pioneer-WUS2 | Microsoft Azure | Microsoft Azure | 157,440 | 141,696 | 16,590 | | Ubuntu 16.04.3 LTS | AMD Zen-2 (Rome) | NVIDIA A100 |
| 99 | Pioneer-EUS | Microsoft Azure | Microsoft Azure | 157,440 | 141,696 | 16,590 | | Ubuntu 16.04.3 LTS | AMD Zen-2 (Rome) | NVIDIA A100 |
| 100 | Pioneer-SCUS | Microsoft Azure | Microsoft Azure | 157,440 | 141,696 | 16,590 | | Ubuntu 16.04.3 LTS | AMD Zen-2 (Rome) | NVIDIA A100 |
| 101 | Kempner | Harvard University | Lenovo | 59,904 | 50,688 | 16,290 | | Linux | AMD Zen-4 (Genoa) | NVIDIA H100 80GB |
| 114 | TX-GAIN | MIT Lincoln Laboratory Supercomputing Center | HPE | 99,216 | 83,952 | 13,390 | | Ubuntu | AMD Zen-4 (Genoa) | NVIDIA H100 |
| 126 | Carpenter | ERDC DSRC | HPE | 276,480 | | 11,617 | 1,100 | HPE Cray OS | AMD Zen-4 (Genoa) | |
| 127 | Kestrel CPU | National Renewable Energy Laboratory | HPE | 212,992 | | 11,372 | | RHEL 8.6 | Intel Sapphire Rapids | |
| 133 | Torch | New York University | HPE | 33,152 | 29,568 | 10,790 | 211 | RHEL 9.4 | Intel Emerald Rapids | NVIDIA H200 SXM5 141 GB |
| 134 | Stampede2 | Texas Advanced Computing Center/University of Texas | DELL | 367,024 | | 10,681 | | CentOS | Intel Xeon Phi | |
| 138 | Derecho CPU partition | National Center for Atmospheric Research (NCAR) | HPE | 316,416 | | 10,324 | | HPE Cray OS | AMD Zen-3 (Milan) | |
| 139 | Blueback CPU | Navy DSRC | HPE | 245,760 | | 10,295 | | HPE Cray OS | AMD Zen-4 (Genoa) | |
| 142 | SNL CTS-2 Hops | Sandia National Laboratories | DELL | 40,960 | 33,792 | 10,030 | | Linux/TOSS | Intel Sapphire Rapids | NVIDIA H100 SXM5 80GB |
| 143 | Cactus | GDIT/NOAA/WCOSS | HPE | 327,680 | | 10,013 | | HPE Cray OS | AMD Zen-2 (Rome) | |
| 144 | Dogwood | GDIT/NOAA/WCOSS | HPE | 327,680 | | 10,013 | | HPE Cray OS | AMD Zen-2 (Rome) | |
| 146 | Amazon EC2 Instance Cluster | Descartes Labs | Amazon Web Services | 172,692 | | 9,950 | | Amazon Linux 2 | Intel Skylake | |
| 149 | NVIDIA Cambridge-1 DGX SuperPOD | NVIDIA Corporation | Nvidia | 79,360 | 69,120 | 9,682 | | Ubuntu 20.04.1 LTS | AMD Zen-2 (Rome) | NVIDIA Tesla A100 80G |
| 150 | SNL CTS-2 Stout | Sandia National Laboratories | DELL | 170,128 | | 9,533 | 1,491 | Linux/TOSS | Intel Sapphire Rapids | |
| 151 | SNL/NNSA CTS-2 Amber | Sandia National Laboratories | DELL | 169,344 | | 9,508 | | Linux/TOSS | Intel Sapphire Rapids | |
| 153 | DGX SuperPOD | NVIDIA Corporation | Nvidia | 127,488 | 122,880 | 9,444 | | Ubuntu 18.04.01 | Intel Skylake | NVIDIA Tesla V100 |
| 158 | Aitken | NASA/Ames Research Center/NAS | HPE | 293,936 | | 9,070 | 2,010 | TOSS | AMD Zen-2 (Rome) | |
| 166 | AiMOS | Rensselaer Polytechnic Institute (CCI) | IBM | 130,000 | 120,000 | 8,339 | 512 | RHEL 7.6 | Power | NVIDIA Volta GV100 |
| 167 | CATT | ERDC DSRC | HPE | 196,608 | | 8,269 | | HPE Cray OS | AMD Zen-4 (Genoa) | |
| 170 | Roxy | Government | HPE | 174,720 | | 8,124 | | CentOS Linux 7 | Intel Cascade lake | |
| 172 | Narwhal | Navy DSRC | HPE | 276,480 | | 8,024 | | SLES15 SP2 | AMD Zen-2 (Rome) | |
| 175 | Minerva | Icahn School of Medicine at Mount Sinai | Lenovo | 28,080 | 23,760 | 7,909 | 171 | Linux | Intel Cascade lake | NVIDIA H100 SXM5 80GB |
| 182 | PupMaya | Government | HPE | 169,920 | | 7,484 | | CentOS Linux 7 | Intel Skylake | |
| 185 | Gautschi AI | Purdue University | DELL | 23,360 | 21,120 | 7,261 | 168 | Rocky Linux 9 | Intel Sapphire Rapids | NVIDIA H100 SXM5 80GB |
| 187 | LLNL/NNSA CTS-2 Bengal | Lawrence Livermore National Laboratory | DELL | 107,520 | | 7,197 | | Linux/TOSS | Intel Sapphire Rapids | |
| 188 | SNL CTS-2 Mead | Sandia National Laboratories | DELL | 123,648 | | 7,057 | | Linux/TOSS | Intel Sapphire Rapids | |
| 189 | LLNL CTS-2 Dane | Lawrence Livermore National Laboratory | DELL | 123,648 | | 7,041 | | Linux/TOSS | Intel Sapphire Rapids | |
| 194 | Theta | DOE/SC/Argonne National Laboratory | HPE | 280,320 | | 6,921 | | Cray Linux Environment | Intel Xeon Phi | |
| 204 | SPR-HBM | BP | Lenovo | 119,952 | | 6,464 | 1,062 | Linux | Intel Sapphire Rapids | |
| 206 | ONYX | ERDC DSRC | HPE | 211,816 | | 6,316 | | Cray Linux Environment | Intel Broadwell | |
| 214 | Lockhart TDS | AMD QTS Data Center | HPE | 33,984 | 31,680 | 6,063 | | HPE Cray OS | AMD Zen-3 (Milan) | AMD Instinct MI250X |
| 216 | Blueback GPU | Navy DSRC | HPE | 32,256 | 29,184 | 6,044 | | HPE Cray OS | AMD Zen-4 (Genoa) | AMD Instinct MI300A |
| 218 | Pleiades | NASA/Ames Research Center/NAS | HPE | 241,108 | | 5,952 | 4,407 | SUSE Linux Enterprise Server 11 | Intel Ivy Bridge | |
| 223 | Sawtooth | Idaho National Laboratory | HPE | 99,792 | | 5,781 | 1,432 | RHEL 7.6 | Intel Cascade lake | |
| 225 | UltraViolet | NYU Langone Health | DELL | 18,688 | 16,896 | 5,558 | | Ubuntu 22.04 | Intel Sapphire Rapids | NVIDIA H100 80GB |
| 227 | Electra | NASA/Ames Research Center/NAS | HPE | 124,416 | | 5,445 | 1,686 | SLES12 SP2 | Intel Skylake | |
| 231 | rzVernal | DOE/NNSA/LLNL | HPE | 35,872 | 33,440 | 5,401 | | TOSS 4 Linux | AMD Zen-3 (Milan) | AMD Instinct MI250X |
| 234 | WindRiver CTS-2 | Idaho National Laboratory | DELL | 94,416 | | 5,333 | 893 | Rocky Linux 8 | Intel Sapphire Rapids | |
| 235 | NA5 | Software Company | Lenovo | 268,928 | | 5,313 | | Linux | AMD Zen-3 (Milan) | |
| 236 | NA5A | Software Company | Lenovo | 268,928 | | 5,313 | | Linux | AMD Zen-3 (Milan) | |
| 241 | TX-GAIA (Green AI Accelerator) | MIT Lincoln Laboratory Supercomputing Center | HPE | 88,400 | 70,720 | 5,161 | 1,436 | CentOS Linux 7 | Intel Cascade lake | NVIDIA Tesla V100 |
| 247 | Cardinal GPU Partition | Ohio Supercomputer Center | DELL | 18,960 | 15,840 | 5,038 | 83 | RHEL 9.2 | Intel Sapphire Rapids | Nvidia H100 SXM5 94Gb |
| 249 | BioHive-1 | Recursion | Nvidia | 39,680 | 34,560 | 4,902 | | Ubuntu 20.04.1 LTS | AMD Zen-2 (Rome) | NVIDIA A100 |
| 251 | Joule 3.0 | DOE/National Energy Technology Laboratory | Koi Computers | 107,648 | | 4,856 | | Linux | AMD Zen-4 (Genoa) | |
| 252 | Eagle | National Renewable Energy Laboratory | HPE | 75,600 | | 4,851 | | CentOS | Intel Skylake | |
| 253 | Cheyenne | National Center for Atmospheric Research (NCAR) | HPE | 144,900 | | 4,788 | 1,727 | SUSE Linux Enterprise Server 12 SP1 | Intel Broadwell | |
| 256 | Derecho GPU partition | National Center for Atmospheric Research (NCAR) | HPE | 39,680 | 34,560 | 4,582 | 169 | HPE Cray OS | AMD Zen-3 (Milan) | NVIDIA A100 SXM4 40 GB |
| 257 | Tioga | DOE/NNSA/LLNL | HPE | 30,208 | 28,160 | 4,548 | | TOSS 4 Linux | AMD Zen-3 (Milan) | AMD Instinct MI250X |
| 270 | SNL/NNSA CTS-1 Manzano | Sandia National Laboratories | Penguin Computing | 71,424 | | 4,281 | 960 | Linux/TOSS | Intel Cascade lake | |
| 272 | NA7A | Software Company | Lenovo | 207,872 | | 4,229 | | Linux | AMD Zen-3 (Milan) | |
| 273 | NA7 | Software Company | Lenovo | 207,872 | | 4,229 | | Linux | AMD Zen-3 (Milan) | |
| 274 | NA2C | Software Company | Lenovo | 111,936 | | 4,228 | | Linux | Intel Ice Lake | |
| 275 | NA2B | Software Company | Lenovo | 111,936 | | 4,228 | | Linux | Intel Ice Lake | |
| 276 | NA2 | Software Company | Lenovo | 111,936 | | 4,228 | | Linux | Intel Ice Lake | |
| 279 | NA6B | Software Company | Lenovo | 111,744 | | 4,156 | | Linux | Intel Ice Lake | |
| 280 | NA6A | Software Company | Lenovo | 111,744 | | 4,156 | | Linux | Intel Ice Lake | |
| 281 | NA6 | Software Company | Lenovo | 111,744 | | 4,156 | | Linux | Intel Ice Lake | |
| 283 | Alpha | Flatiron Institute - Simons Foundation | Lenovo | 7,488 | 6,336 | 4,099 | | Linux | Intel Cascade lake | NVIDIA H100 |
| 284 | Raphael | Flatiron Institute - Simons Foundation | Lenovo | 14,976 | 12,672 | 4,090 | 90 | Linux | AMD Zen-4 (Genoa) | NVIDIA H100 80GB |
| 286 | NA12A | Software Company | Lenovo | 187,648 | | 4,052 | | Linux | AMD Zen-3 (Milan) | |
| 287 | NA12 | Software Company | Lenovo | 187,648 | | 4,052 | | Linux | AMD Zen-3 (Milan) | |
| 288 | Abel | Petroleum Geo-Services | HPE | 145,920 | | 4,042 | 1,800 | Cray Linux Environment | Intel Haswell | |
| 289 | Warhawk | Air Force Research Laboratory | HPE | 129,920 | | 4,034 | | SLES15 SP2 | AMD Zen-2 (Rome) | |
| 291 | Raider | Air Force Research Laboratory | Penguin Computing | 206,304 | 15,840 | 4,016 | | RHEL 8 | AMD Zen-3 (Milan) | NVIDIA A40 |
| 292 | DGX Saturn V | NVIDIA Corporation | Nvidia | 87,040 | 81,920 | 3,998 | | Ubuntu | Intel Broadwell | NVIDIA Tesla V100 |
| 293 | NA9B | Software Company | Lenovo | 200,448 | | 3,960 | | Linux | AMD Zen-3 (Milan) | |
| 294 | NA9A | Software Company | Lenovo | 200,448 | | 3,960 | | Linux | AMD Zen-3 (Milan) | |
| 295 | NA9 | Software Company | Lenovo | 200,448 | | 3,960 | | Linux | AMD Zen-3 (Milan) | |
| 296 | NA9Z | Software Company | Lenovo | 200,448 | | 3,960 | | Linux | AMD Zen-3 (Milan) | |
| 300 | NA1 | Software Company | Lenovo | 191,232 | | 3,921 | | Linux | AMD Zen-3 (Milan) | |
| 301 | Nautilus | Navy DSRC | Penguin Computing | 191,680 | 15,552 | 3,898 | | RHEL 8.7 | AMD Zen-3 (Milan) | NVIDIA A100 |
| 306 | Delta | NCSA/Illinois Urbana-Champaign | HPE | 49,600 | 43,200 | 3,812 | | RHEL 8.4 | AMD Zen-3 (Milan) | NVIDIA A100 |
| 310 | LLNL Ruby | Lawrence Livermore National Laboratory | Supermicro | 85,568 | | 3,700 | | Linux/TOSS | Intel Cascade Lake | |
| 311 | Orion | Mississippi State University | DELL | 70,560 | | 3,666 | | Linux | Intel Skylake | |
| 315 | NA10B | Software Company | Lenovo | 184,320 | | 3,642 | | Linux | AMD Zen-3 (Milan) | |
| 316 | NA10A | Software Company | Lenovo | 184,320 | | 3,642 | | Linux | AMD Zen-3 (Milan) | |
| 317 | NA10 | Software Company | Lenovo | 184,320 | | 3,642 | | Linux | AMD Zen-3 (Milan) | |
| 318 | Joule 2.0 | DOE/National Energy Technology Laboratory | HPE | 86,400 | 11,200 | 3,609 | | Linux | Intel Skylake | NVIDIA Tesla P100 |
| 322 | | Government | HPE | 72,800 | 62,400 | 3,577 | 1,499 | Linux | Intel IvyBridge | NVIDIA Tesla K40 |
| 323 | | Government | HPE | 72,800 | 62,400 | 3,577 | 1,499 | Linux | Intel IvyBridge | NVIDIA Tesla K40 |
| 324 | Anvil | Purdue University | DELL | 127,488 | | 3,563 | 792 | Rocky Linux 8.4 | AMD Zen-3 (Milan) | |
| 327 | B1A | Software Company MUS | Lenovo | 80,640 | | 3,546 | | Linux | Intel Cascade Lake | |
| 337 | Tenaya | DOE/NNSA/LLNL | HPE | 22,656 | 21,120 | 3,411 | | TOSS 4 Linux | AMD Zen-3 (Milan) | AMD Instinct MI250X |
| 338 | SEAS H100 | Harvard University | Lenovo | 13,104 | 11,088 | 3,375 | 81 | Linux | AMD Zen-4 (Genoa) | NVIDIA H100 80GB |
| 342 | NA4 | Software Company | Lenovo | 85,248 | | 3,320 | | Linux | Intel Ice Lake | |
| 343 | NA4A | Software Company | Lenovo | 85,248 | | 3,320 | | Linux | Intel Ice Lake | |
| 344 | Topaz | ERDC DSRC | HPE | 124,200 | | 3,319 | 5,175 | SUSE Linux Enterprise Server 11 | Intel Haswell | |
| 345 | AI Research SuperCluster | Facebook | Self-made | 60,512 | 55,552 | 3,307 | 350 | Ubuntu | Intel Broadwell | NVIDIA Tesla P100 |
| 348 | LLNL/NNSA CTS-1 MAGMA | Lawrence Livermore National Laboratory | Penguin Computing | 62,400 | | 3,241 | 887 | Linux/TOSS | Intel Cascade Lake | |
| 349 | Mustang | Air Force Research Laboratory | HPE | 55,296 | | 3,221 | | Red Hat Enterprise Linux | Intel Skylake | |
| 350 | NA13A | Software Company | Lenovo | 156,160 | | 3,202 | | Linux | AMD Zen-3 (Milan) | |
| 351 | NA13 | Software Company | Lenovo | 156,160 | | 3,202 | | Linux | AMD Zen-3 (Milan) | |
| 352 | Big Red 200, GPU Partition | Indiana University | HPE | 31,744 | 27,648 | 3,194 | | SLES15 SP2 | AMD Zen-3 (Milan) | NVIDIA A100 |
| 357 | | Software Company MUS | Lenovo | 71,680 | | 3,152 | | Linux | Intel Cascade Lake | |
| 358 | B5A | Software Company MUS | Lenovo | 71,680 | | 3,152 | | Linux | Intel Cascade Lake | |
| 362 | NO6 | Software Company MUS | Lenovo | 71,680 | | 3,152 | | Linux | Intel Cascade Lake | |
| 364 | | Government | HPE | 225,984 | | 3,144 | 6,328 | Cray Linux Environment | Intel Ivy Bridge | |
| 365 | Vader | Hewlett Packard Enterprise | HPE | 8,960 | 8,448 | 3,142 | 54 | RHEL 9.4 | Intel Emerald Rapids | NVIDIA H200 SXM5 141 GB |
| 369 | A5A | Software Company MUS | Lenovo | 92,160 | | 3,131 | | Linux | Intel Cascade Lake | |
| 370 | A1A | Software Company MUS | Lenovo | 92,160 | | 3,131 | | Linux | Intel Cascade Lake | |
| 371 | A1A | Software Company MUS | Lenovo | 92,160 | | 3,131 | | Linux | Intel Cascade Lake | |
| 372 | NO4 | Software Company MUS | Lenovo | 92,160 | | 3,131 | | Linux | Intel Ice Lake | |
| 373 | NA8B | Software Company | Lenovo | 84,096 | | 3,128 | | Linux | Intel Ice Lake | |
| 374 | NA8A | Software Company | Lenovo | 84,096 | | 3,128 | | Linux | Intel Ice Lake | |
| 375 | NA8 | Software Company | Lenovo | 84,096 | | 3,128 | | Linux | Intel Ice Lake | |
| 376 | NA8 | Software Company | Lenovo | 84,096 | | 3,128 | | Linux | Intel Ice Lake | |
| 377 | NA8Z | Software Company | Lenovo | 84,096 | | 3,128 | | Linux | Intel Ice Lake | |
| 378 | Thunder | Air Force Research Laboratory | HPE | 152,692 | 27,056 | 3,126 | 4,820 | SUSE Linux Enterprise Server 11 | Intel Haswell | NVIDIA Tesla K40/Intel Xeon Phi 7120P |
| 380 | IronMan | Dell Technologies HPC & AI Innovation Lab | DELL | 20,096 | 19,456 | 3,109 | | Ubuntu 22.04.5 LTS | Intel Sapphire Rapids | AMD Instinct MI300X |
| 387 | Medusa | Dell Technologies HPC & AI Innovation Lab | DELL | 9,216 | 8,448 | 3,083 | | Ubuntu 22.04.2 LTS | Intel Sapphire Rapids | NVIDIA H100 |
| 389 | Hera | NOAA Environmental Security Computer Center | HPE | 63,840 | | 3,081 | | CentOS | Intel Skylake | |
| 393 | Palmetto2 | Clemson University | DELL | 52,080 | 40,800 | 3,011 | | Rocky Linux 8.6 | Intel Skylake | NVIDIA Tesla V100 |
| 396 | NO3 | Software Company MUS | Lenovo | 88,320 | | 3,001 | | Linux | Intel Cascade Lake | |
| 406 | A9A | Software Company MUS | Lenovo | 86,016 | | 2,923 | | Linux | Intel Cascade Lake | |
| 407 | A6A | Software Company MUS | Lenovo | 86,016 | | 2,923 | | Linux | Intel Cascade Lake | |
| 408 | Jean | Army Research Laboratory; DoD Supercomputing Resource; Center (ARL DSRC) | Liqid | 55,296 | | 2,918 | | CentOS | Intel Cascade Lake | |
| 412 | Henri | Flatiron Institute | Lenovo | 8,288 | 7,392 | 2,882 | 44 | Linux | Intel Ice Lake | NVIDIA H100 |
| 414 | A8A | Software Company MUS | Lenovo | 84,480 | | 2,870 | | Linux | Intel Cascade Lake | |
| 415 | A8A | Software Company MUS | Lenovo | 84,480 | | 2,870 | | Linux | Intel Cascade Lake | |
| 416 | A3A | Software Company MUS | Lenovo | 84,480 | | 2,870 | | Linux | Intel Cascade Lake | |
| 417 | A14A | Software Company MUS | Lenovo | 84,480 | | 2,870 | | Linux | Intel Cascade Lake | |
| 418 | A14A | Software Company MUS | Lenovo | 84,480 | | 2,870 | | Linux | Intel Cascade Lake | |
| 423 | Freeman | ERDC DSRC | HPE | 79,104 | | 2,829 | | RHEL 7.7 | AMD Zen-2 (Rome) | |
| 440 | SNL/NNSA CTS-1 Attaway | Sandia National Laboratories | Penguin Computing | 52,920 | | 2,725 | 750 | Linux/TOSS | Intel Skylake | |
| 447 | Hypercluster | Microsoft Research | Nvidia | 47,808 | 46,080 | 2,666 | | Ubuntu 18.04.01 | Intel Skylake | NVIDIA Tesla V100 |
| 449 | NO2 | Software Company MUS | Lenovo | 78,336 | | 2,662 | | Linux | Intel Cascade Lake | |
| 453 | Grace | Texas A&M University | DELL | 43,200 | 1,532 | 2,639 | | CentOS | Intel Cascade Lake | |
| 454 | LLNL/NNSA CTS-1 Jade | Lawrence Livermore National Laboratory | Penguin Computing | 95,472 | | 2,633 | 13,620 | Linux/TOSS | Intel Broadwell | |
| 455 | LLNL CTS-1 Quartz | Lawrence Livermore National Laboratory | Penguin Computing | 95,472 | | 2,633 | 13,620 | Linux/TOSS | Intel Broadwell | |
| 460 | A7A | Software Company MUS | Lenovo | 76,800 | | 2,609 | | Linux | Intel Cascade Lake | |
| 461 | A7A | Software Company MUS | Lenovo | 76,800 | | 2,609 | | Linux | Intel Cascade Lake | |
| 462 | A1B | Software Company MUS | Lenovo | 76,800 | | 2,609 | | Linux | Intel Cascade Lake | |
| 463 | NO1 | Software Company MUS | Lenovo | 76,800 | | 2,609 | | Linux | Intel Cascade Lake | |
| 470 | Conesus | University of Rochester - Laboratory for Laser Energetics | DELL | 43,008 | | 2,589 | 409 | TOSS 4 Linux | Intel Sapphire Rapids | |
| 480 | Sol | Arizona State University | DELL | 41,856 | 24,192 | 2,546 | 173 | Rocky Linux 8 | AMD Zen-3 (Milan) | NVIDIA A100 SXM4 80 GB |
| 481 | cascade | DOE/SC/Pacific Northwest National Laboratory | Atipa | 194,616 | 171,720 | 2,539 | 1,384 | Linux | Intel SandyBridge | Intel Xeon Phi 5110P |
| 483 | Rattler | Dell Technologies HPC & AI Innovation Lab | DELL | 26,880 | 20,736 | 2,531 | | RHEL | AMD Zen-3 (Milan) | NVIDIA Tesla A100 40G |
| 486 | Improv | DOE/SC/Argonne National Laboratory | DELL | 105,600 | | 2,510 | | RHEL | AMD Zen-3 (Milan) | |
| 490 | Excalibur | Army Research Laboratory; DoD Supercomputing Resource; Center (ARL DSRC) | HPE | 100,064 | | 2,485 | 1,466 | Cray Linux Environment | Intel Haswell | |
| 492 | Expanse | UCSD/San Diego Supercomputer Center | DELL | 91,648 | 16,640 | 2,481 | | CentOS | AMD Zen-2 (Rome) | |
| 496 | Kay | Army Research Laboratory; DoD Supercomputing Resource; Center (ARL DSRC) | Liqid | 46,848 | | 2,476 | | CentOS | Intel Cascade lake | |
| 498 | Centennial | US Army Research Laboratory (ARL) | HPE | 73,920 | | 2,444 | 835 | RHEL 7.2 | Intel Broadwell | |
| 499 | Greene-H100 | New York University | Lenovo | 9,360 | 7,920 | 2,436 | | Linux | AMD Zen-4 (Genoa) | NVIDIA H100 80GB |

== Decommissioned ==
- CDC 6600 – Control Data Corporation, decommissioned in the 1970s
- Cray-1 – Cray Research, retired around 1990
- Cray-2 – Cray Research, retired in the 1990s
- Connection Machine – Thinking Machines Corporation, discontinued in the 1990s
- ASCI Red – Sandia National Laboratories, decommissioned in 2006
- ASCI White – IBM / Lawrence Livermore National Laboratory, decommissioned in 2006
- Blue Gene – IBM / various labs; Blue Gene/L retired and succeeded by Sequoia
- Roadrunner – Los Alamos National Laboratory, decommissioned in 2013
- Jaguar – Oak Ridge National Laboratory, decommissioned in 2012
- Sequoia – Lawrence Livermore National Laboratory, decommissioned in 2020
- Titan – Oak Ridge National Laboratory, decommissioned in 2019

== See also ==
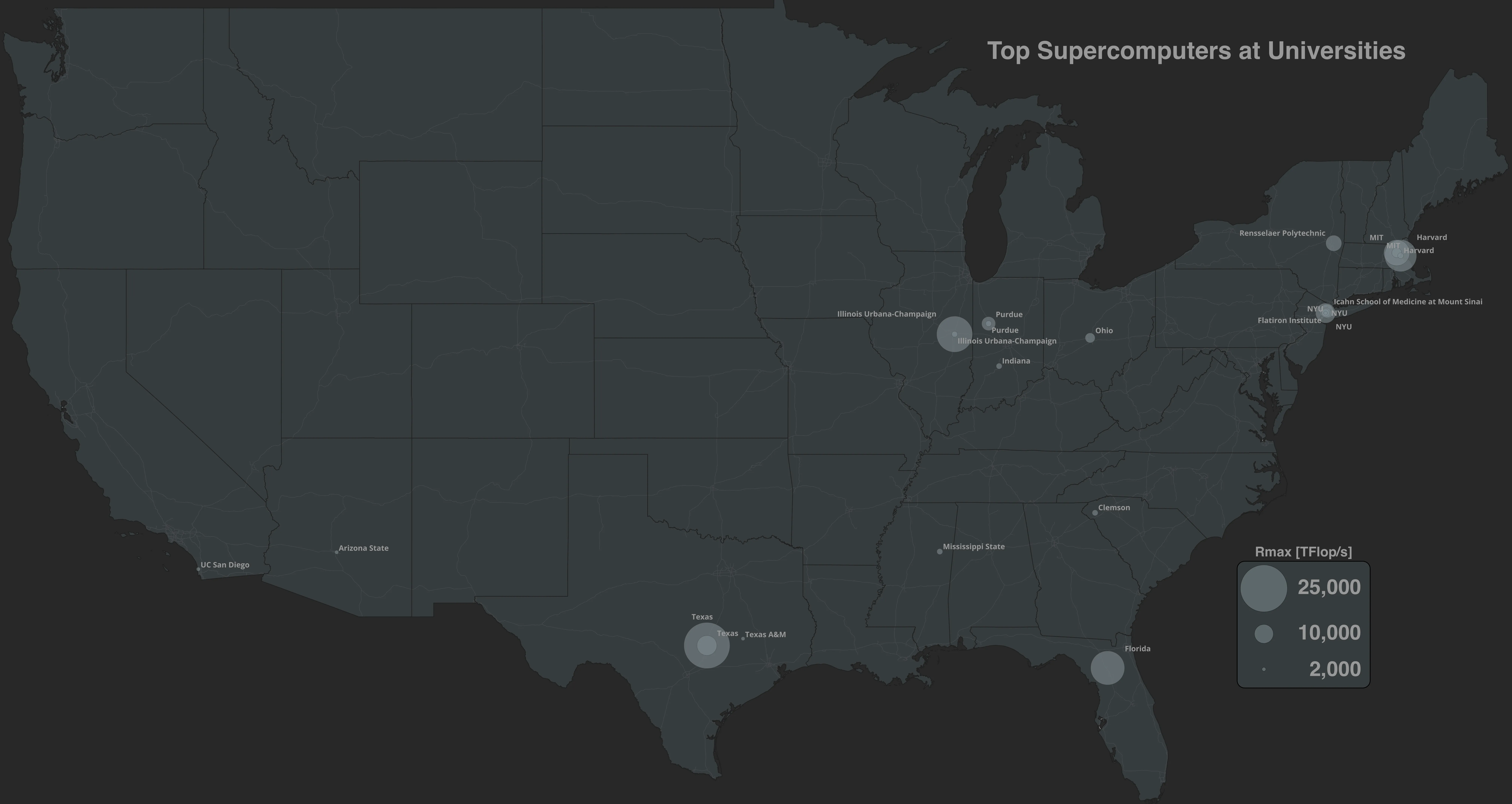
Top supercomputers at universities in the United States

- TOP500
- Green500 – Top green supercomputers
- List of fastest computers
- History of supercomputing
- High-performance computing
- Supercomputer architecture
- Supercomputer operating system
- Exascale computing
- List of artificial intelligence projects
- National Center for Supercomputing Applications (NCSA)
- Oak Ridge Leadership Computing Facility
- Open Science Grid Consortium
- National Energy Research Scientific Computing Center (NERSC)
- Advanced Simulation and Computing Program
- SC (conference) – annual Supercomputing Conference
- Stargate LLC — joint venture created by OpenAI, SoftBank, Oracle, and investment firm MGX.

=== Computational Genomics & Biology Mega-Projects ===
- Earth BioGenome Project
- Human Genome Project
- Human Cell Atlas
- Cancer Genome Atlas
- ENCODE
- 1000 Genomes Project
- Human Microbiome Project
- AlphaFold

=== Computational Physics, Astronomy, and Space Projects ===
- Event Horizon Telescope
- Einstein@Home
- Muon g-2
- ITER
- National Ignition Facility
- Blue Brain Project
- Human Brain Project
- Square Kilometre Array
- Vera C. Rubin Observatory
