= Horst D. Simon =

Computer scientist

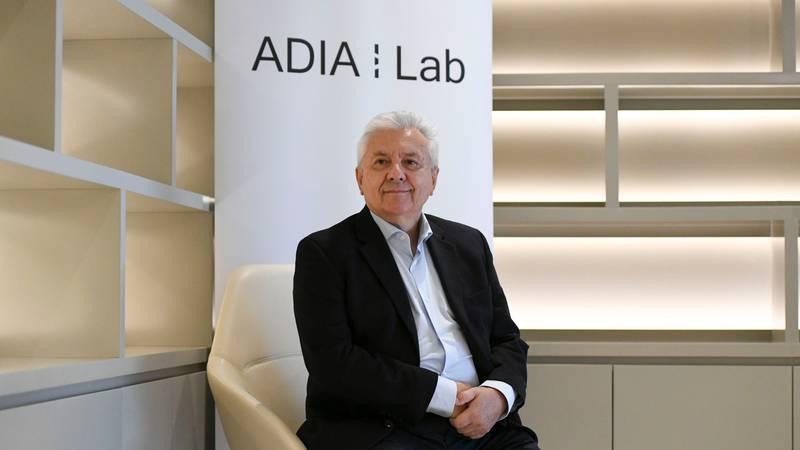
- Born: August 8, 1953 (age 72); Stadtsteinach, Germany
- Citizenship: American
- Children: 2

Academic background
- Education: Ph.D. in Mathematics
- Alma mater: University of California, Berkeley
- Thesis: The Lanczos Algorithm for the Solution of Symmetric Linear Systems. (1982)
- Doctoral advisor: Prof. Beresford N. Parlett

Academic work
- Discipline: Computer scientist
- Main interests: High Performance Computing, parallel computing, algorithms, partitioning

Horst D. Simon (born August 8, 1953) is a computer scientist known for his contributions to high-performance computing (HPC) and computational science. He is director of ADIA Lab in Abu Dhabi, UAE and editor of TOP500.

== Early life and education ==
Simon was born on August 8, 1953, in Stadtsteinach, Germany. From 1963 to 1972, he attended a high school in Germany, Markgraf-Georg-Friedrich Gymnasium Kulmbach. He completed his undergraduate studies at Technische Universität Berlin from 1973 to 1976. Simon joined University of California, Berkeley in 1976 from where he studied Masters of Mathematics from 1976 to 1977 and graduated with PhD in Mathematics in 1982.

== Career ==
Horst Simon is an expert in the development of parallel computational methods for the solution of scientific problems. His research interests include development of sparse matrix algorithms, algorithms for large-scale eigenvalue problems, and domain decomposition algorithms.

Early in his career he has served as a senior manager for Silicon Graphics from 1994 to 1996. Horst Simon has been an assistant professor of Applied Mathematics at the State University of New York from 1982 to 1983.

=== Boeing (1983 – 1987) ===
Simon has worked at Boeing Computer Services from 1983 to 1989. He was part of a team at Boeing that improved the stability and efficiency of the Lanczos method, which was implemented in the BCSLIB library and used by MSC Nastran, a commercial software package for structural analysis. The block-shifted and inverted Lanczos solver incorporated the research of five PhD theses and involved collaboration between academia and industry Some of the key innovations that Simon and his colleagues introduced were block algorithms, selective reorthogonalization, shifting techniques, and a smart algorithm for choosing shifts These enhancements increased the computational performance and robustness of the Lanczos method for solving large and complex eigenvalue problems.

=== NASA Ames (1987 – 1995) ===
From 1989 to 1994, Simon has worked at NASA Ames Research Center in Moffett Field, CA while serving as head of Applied Research Department for Computer Sciences Corporation. He developed the Conjugate Gradient benchmark, one of the NAS Parallel Benchmarks, a set of programs that measure the performance of parallel supercomputers. His benchmark has been widely used to evaluate and optimize parallel computing technologies, and has contributed to the establishment of standards and metrics for high-performance computing.

=== TOP500 (1996 – current) ===
In 1996 Simon joined the TOP500 project, that was founded by Erich Strohmaier, Hans Meuer, and Jack Dongarra in 1993.

=== Lawrence Berkeley National Laboratory (1996-2022) ===
Simon joined Lawrence Berkeley National Laboratory in 1996 as director of the newly formed NERSC Division. In 2004, Simon was appointed Associate Laboratory Director (ALD) for Computing Sciences at Berkeley Lab. In 2007, Simon was appointed adjunct professor in the Department of Electrical Engineering and Computer Science (EECS) at UC Berkeley.

In 2010, Simon was appointed Deputy Laboratory Director and Chief Research Officer (CRO) of LBNL. In collaboration with the senior laboratory scientific leadership, he develops, funds, and monitors the progress of the multidisciplinary laboratory research initiatives. In 2018 these include water-energy research, machine learning for science, microbiome research for environmental application, quantum information science, advanced microelectronics beyond Moore’s law, and biogenic materials and chemistry.

From 2012 to 2014 Simon had assumed the leadership role in the development of the “second campus” at LBNL, a project to create a new site for the expanding programs at LBNL in biosciences and the environment. From 2014 onward, Simon focused his activities on developing the strategic thrust of “Energy Innovation” at Berkeley Lab. Since 2016 Simon is leading the Diversity and Inclusion in Science working group at LBNL, exploring new structures to recruit and retain a more diverse workforce.

=== ADIA Lab (2022-present) ===
Simon was appointed in 2022 as the founding director of ADIA Lab, an independent research centre for data and computational sciences based in Abu Dhabi, United Arab Emirates.

== Selected publications ==
=== Articles ===
- Simon, Horst D; Bailey, David H; Barszcz, Eric; Barton, John T (1991). "The NAS parallel benchmarks". The International Journal of Supercomputing Applications. 5 (3). Sage Publications: 63–73. doi:10.1177/109434209100500306. hdl:2060/19940008727. S2CID 817500.
- Pothen, Alex; Simon, Horst D; Liou, Kang-Pu (1990). "Partitioning sparse matrices with eigenvectors of graphs". SIAM Journal on Matrix Analysis and Applications. 11 (3). Society for Industrial and Applied Mathematics: 430–452. doi:10.1137/0611030.
- Ding, Chris; He, Xiaofeng; Simon, Horst D (2005). "On the Equivalence of Nonnegative Matrix Factorization and Spectral Clustering". Proceedings of the 2005 SIAM International Conference on Data Mining. Society for Industrial and Applied Mathematics. pp. 606–610. doi:10.1137/1.9781611972757.70. ISBN 978-0-89871-593-4.
- Simon, Horst D (1991). "Partitioning of unstructured problems for parallel processing". Computing Systems in Engineering. 2 (2–3). Pergamon: 135–148. doi:10.1016/0956-0521(91)90014-V.
- Barnard, Stephen T; Simon, Horst D (1994). "Fast multilevel implementation of recursive spectral bisection for partitioning unstructured problems". Concurrency: Practice and Experience. 6 (2). John Wiley & Sons, Ltd: 101–117. doi:10.1002/cpe.4330060203.
- Ding, Chris HQ; He, Xiaofeng; Zha, Hongyuan; Gu, Ming; Simon, Horst D (2001). "A min-max cut algorithm for graph partitioning and data clustering". Proceedings 2001 IEEE International Conference on Data Mining. IEEE. pp. 107–114. doi:10.1109/ICDM.2001.989507. ISBN 0-7695-1119-8. S2CID 18520895.

=== Books ===
- Simon, Horst D, ed. (16 December 1991). Scientific Applications Of The Connection Machine (2nd ed.). World Scientific. ISBN 9789814555043.
- Simon, Horst D, ed. (1992). Parallel computational fluid dynamics. MIT Press. ISBN 0262193264. OL 1708583M.
- David H. Bailey; Horst D Simon, eds. (1995). Proceedings of the Seventh SIAM Conference on Parallel Processing for Scientific Computing. Siam. ISBN 9780898713442.
- Alfonso Ferreira; José Rolim; Shang-Hua Teng; Horst Simon, eds. (1998). Solving Irregularly Structured Problems in Parallel. Lecture Notes in Computer Science. Vol. 1457. Conference proceedings info: IRREGULAR. doi:10.1007/BFb0018521. ISBN 978-3-540-64809-3. S2CID 26329599.
- Michael A. Heroux; Padma Raghavan; Horst D. Simon, eds. (2006). Parallel Processing for Scientific Computing. SIAM. ISBN 9780898718133.

== Awards and nominations ==
- 1998 — Gordon Bell Prize (jointly with group from Cray and Boeing) in recognition of his efforts in parallel processing research.
- 1995 — H. Julian Allen Award (jointly with the NAS Parallel Benchmarks Team) for notable scientific papers written by authors at NASA Ames Research Center, for the NAS Parallel Benchmarks.
- 2009 — Gordon Bell Prize (in collaboration with IBM researchers) for the second time for the development of innovative techniques that produce new levels of performance on a real application.
- 2012 — Gordon Bell Prize Finalist (jointly with group from Intel and LBNL) for development of best price performance application.
- 2015 — Test of Time Award (ACM), for the long term impact (citations) of the paper “NAS Parallel Benchmarks” (jointly with the NAS Parallel Benchmarks team).
- 2016 — Society for Industrial and Applied Mathematics - Supercomputing Career Award.
