= Voyager-EUS2 =

Supercomputer

Voyager-EUS2 is a supercomputer built by Microsoft Azure, capable of 39.531 petaflops, and is ranked 14th in the TOP500 as of November 2022. Voyager-EUS2 runs from Microsoft Azure East US 2 region and it utilizes 253,440 cores on AMD EPYC CPUs along with an NVIDIA A100 GPU with 80GB memory and a Mellanox HDR Infiniband for data transfer running on Linux distribution.Si

== See also ==
- TOP500
