= Gyoukou =

Japanese supercomputer

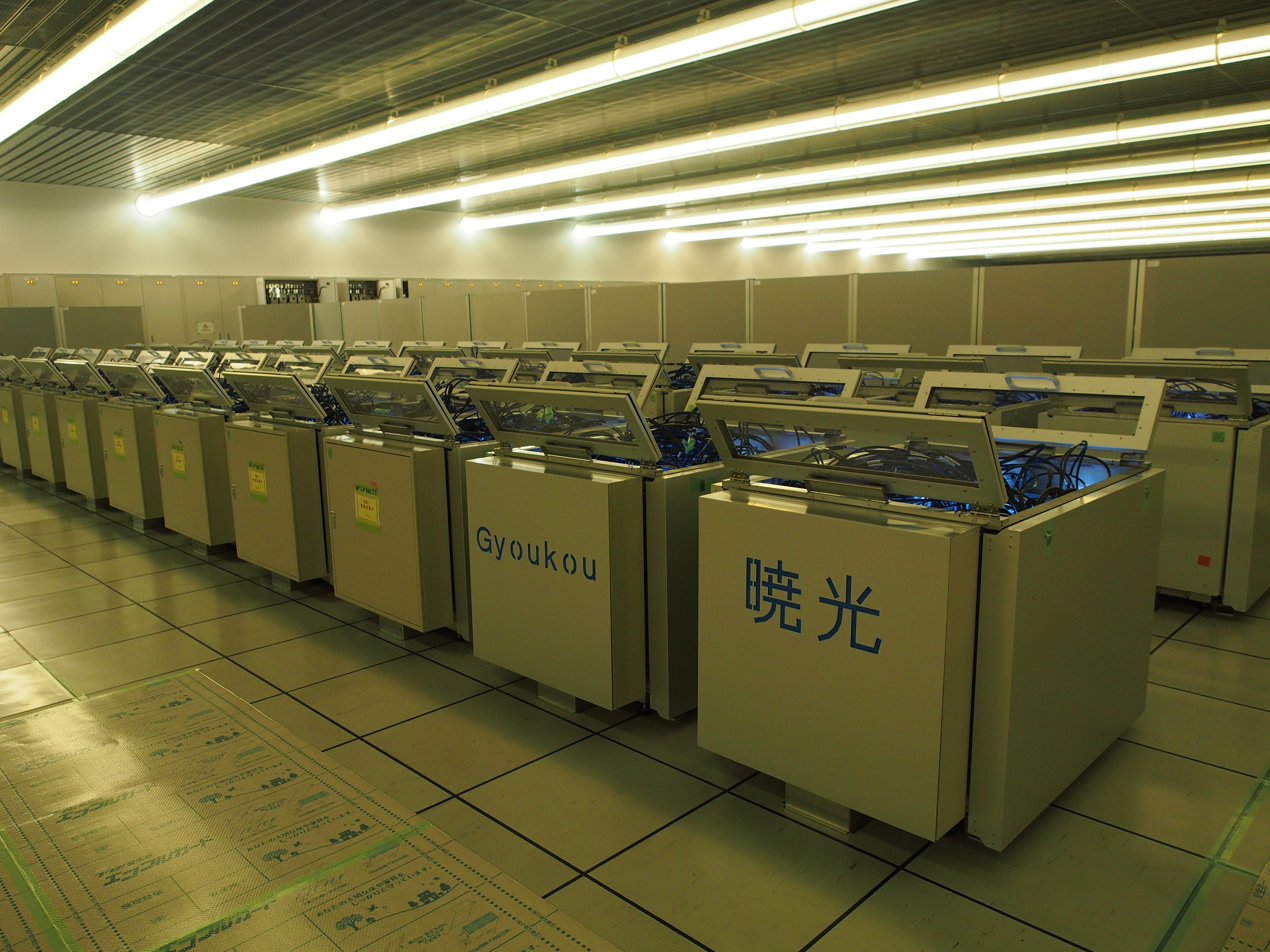
- Active: operational 2017
- Location: JAMSTEC Earth Simulator Building
- Architecture: 10,000 PEZY-SC2 processor modules (2048 processing elements per module; 20,480,000 total), 1250 Intel Xeon D host processors
- Power: 1350 kW
- Operating system: Linux CentOS
- Memory: 680 TiB
- Speed: 19.14 PFLOPS (Rmax)
- Ranking: TOP500: 4, November 2017

Gyoukou (Japanese: 暁光, Hepburn: gyōkō; dawn light) is a supercomputer developed by ExaScaler and PEZY Computing, based around ExaScaler's ZettaScaler immersion cooling system.

It was deployed at the Japan Agency for Marine-Earth Science and Technology (JAMSTEC) Yokohama Institute for Earth Sciences, the same floor where the Earth Simulator is located. Amid the scandal regarding the development grant, it was removed from JAMSTEC in April 2018.

== System ==
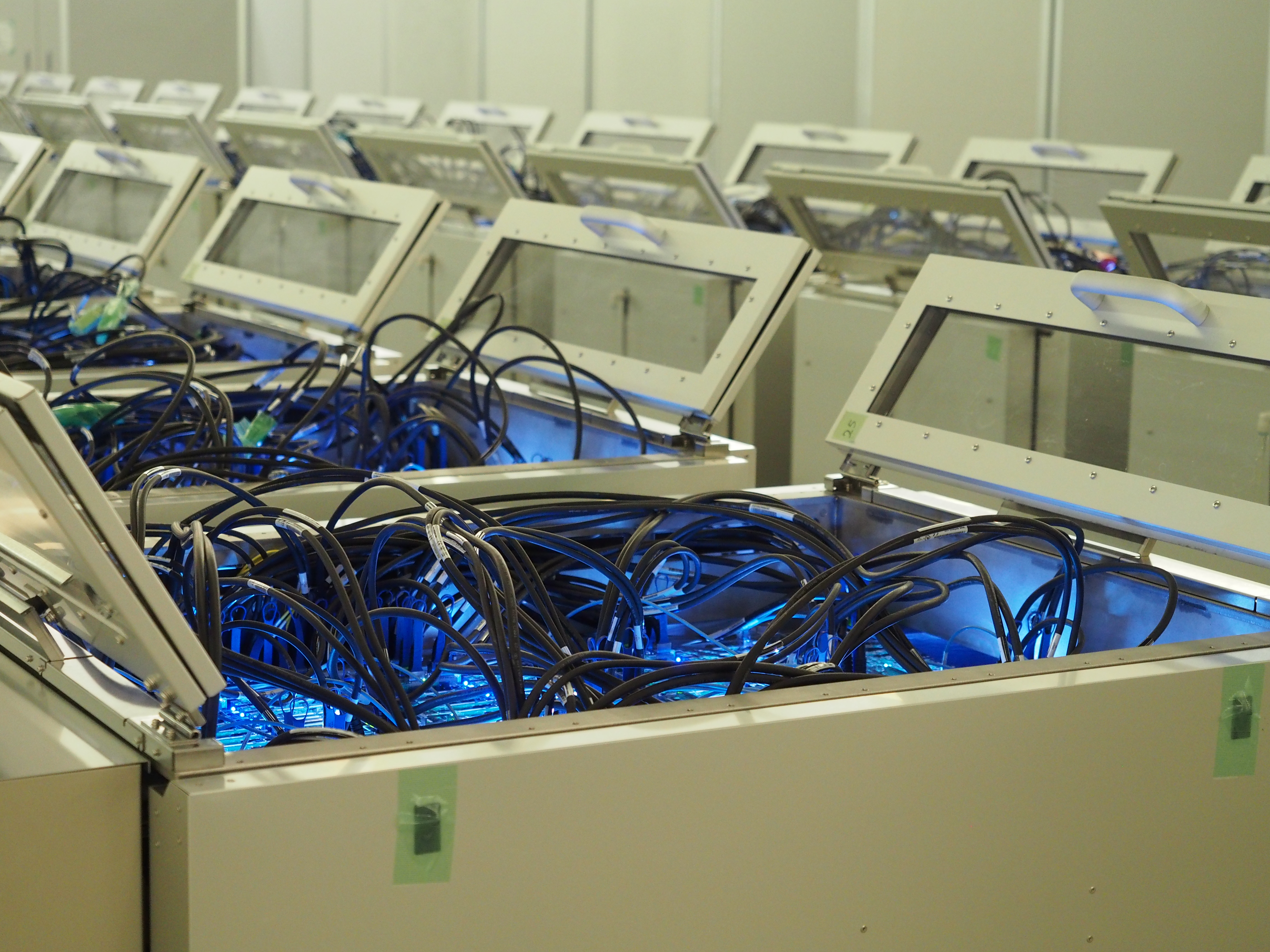

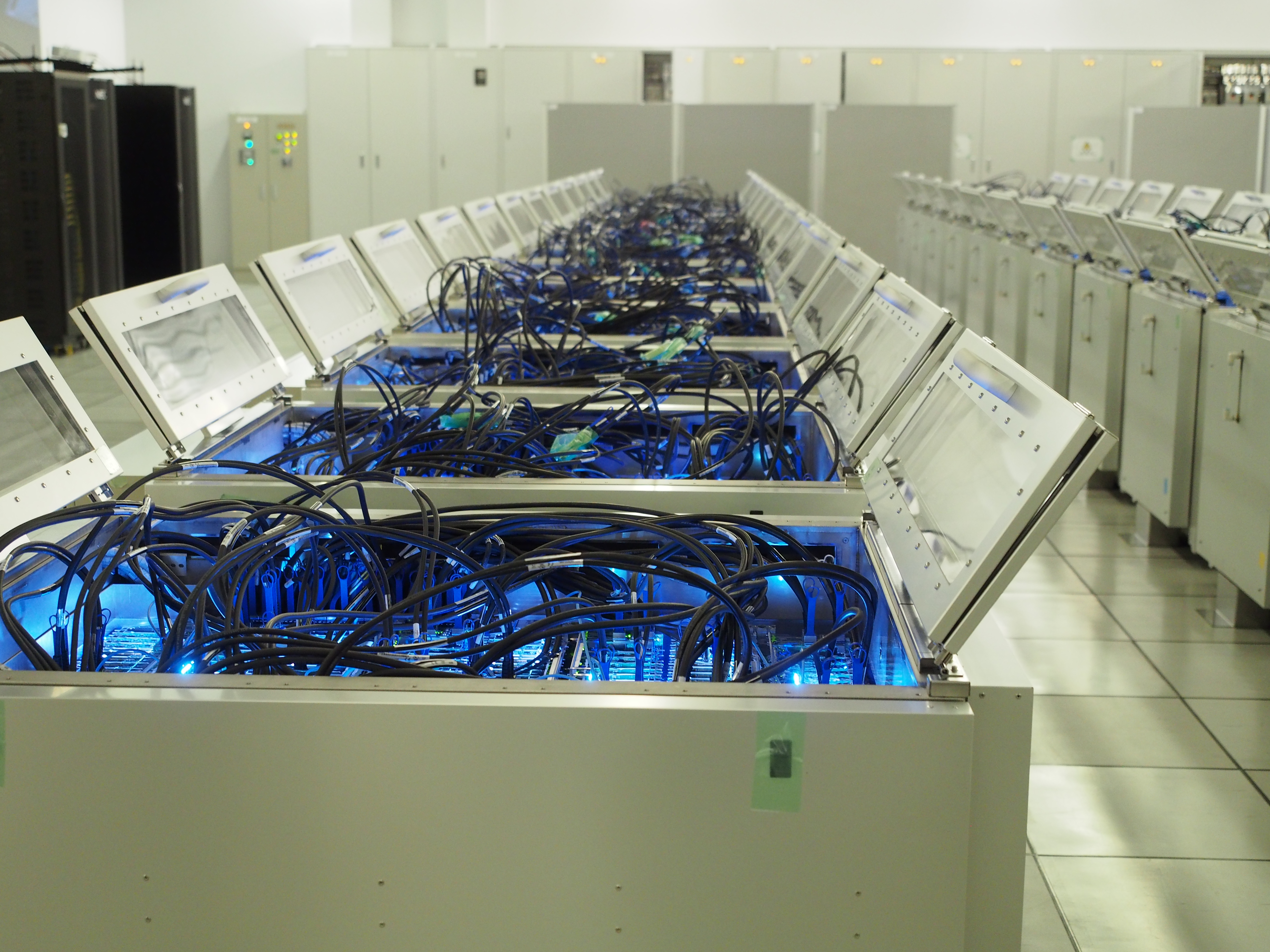

Gyoukou is based on ExaScaler's ZettaScaler-2.x technology which features liquid immersion cooling system using Fluorinert.

Each immersion tank can contain 16 Bricks. A Brick consists of a backplane board, 32 PEZY-SC2 modules, 4 Intel Xeon D host processors, and 4 InfiniBand EDR cards. Modules inside a Brick are connected by hierarchical PCI Express fabric switches, and the Bricks are interconnected by InfiniBand.

Each PEZY-SC2 module contains 2048 processing elements (1 GHz design), six MIPS64 control processors, and 4 DDR4 DIMMs (64GB per module as of November 2017).

== Performance ==
With partial configuration, Gyoukou was ranked 69th at 1,677.1 teraflops on the June 2017 TOP500 ranking.

After upgrade to full scale (equivalent of 19.5 immersion tanks) using newer ZettaScaler-2.2 system, it ranked 4th at 19,135.8 teraflops on the November 2017 TOP500 ranking. At the time of benchmarking, 1984 out of 2048 cores of each PEZY-SC2 were used at 700 MHz clock.

Gyoukou has high energy efficiency, and it ranked 5th at 14.173 gigaflops/watt on the November 2017 Green500 energy efficiency ranking. at the time benchmarked as 19,860,000 "cores" (after an upgrade).
