= HPC (Eni) =

Series of computing systems

- Active: December 2024
- Operators: Eni
- Location: Green Data Center in Ferrera Erbognone (PV), Italy
- Power: 8,46 MW
- Operating system: RHEL 8.9
- Speed: 477.90 petaFlop/s (Rmax) / 606.97 petaFlop/s (Rpeak)
- Website: www.eni.com/visual-design/green-data-center-hpc/en

HPC refers to the series of high-performance computing systems developed and operated by Eni. The supercomputers are housed at the Green Data Center in Ferrera Erbognone (PV), Italy. The latest system, HPC7, was ranked 6th most powerful supercomputer in the world in the June 2026 TOP500 list.

== History ==
Eni's first supercomputer is HPCC1, a CPU-only system built by IBM. Subsequent generations HPC2 and HPC3 introduced hybrid CPU-GPU architectures. HPC4, constructed by Hewlett Packard Enterprise, further improved performance. In 2020, Eni unveiled HPC5, developed in collaboration with Dell Technologies. The latest addition, HPC6, launched in December 2024, ranks among the world's most powerful supercomputers.

== Architecture ==
=== HPC7 ===
HPC7 is a high-performance computing system that was designed for Eni and delivered in June 2026. It is located in the Eni's Green Data Center in Ferrera Erbognone, Italy, on an HPE Cray EX255a platform with AMD EPYC processors and AMD Instinct MI300A accelerators. The system's performance in the High-Performance LINPACK benchmark was sustained at 571.5 petaflops and had a theoretical peak performance of 861.13 petaflops. It was ranked sixth in the world in the June 2026 TOP500 list, and was the top industrial-use supercomputer in the list.

=== HPC6 ===
HPC6 is built on the HPE Cray EX4000 platform, featuring a hybrid architecture with 3,472 nodes. Each node comprises an AMD EPYC™ 64-core CPU and four AMD Instinc MI250X GPUs, totaling 13,888 GPUs. The system employs HPE's Slingshot-11 interconnect and is paired with a ClusterStore E1000 storage solution. This configuration enables HPC6 to achieve a peak performance exceeding 606 petaFLOPS.

=== HPC5 ===
Eni launched HPC5 in early 2020. The system was built using Dell EMC PowerEdge C4140 servers, each outfitted with two Intel Xeon Gold 6252 processors (24 cores each) and four NVIDIA V100 GPUs, for a total of 7,280 GPUs across 1,820 nodes. It employed a high-speed interconnect infrastructure and expanded the system's overall peak performance to 51.72 petaflops, with a combined performance of 70 petaflops when operating alongside HPC4. HPC5 enabled more detailed simulations in geosciences, fluid dynamics, and climate modeling.

=== HPC4 ===
HPC4 was introduced in 2018 and built using HPE ProLiant DL380 nodes. Each node featured two Intel Xeon Platinum 8160 processors with 24 cores and two NVIDIA Tesla P100 GPUs. The system included 1,600 nodes and an enhanced EDR InfiniBand interconnection. Storage capacity was increased to 15 petabytes, supporting high-resolution seismic datasets and advanced simulation outputs. HPC4 delivered 18.6 petaflops of peak performance, making it one of the most powerful industrial systems in the world at the time of its launch.

=== HPC3 ===
In 2017, Eni inaugurated HPC3, achieving a peak power of 8.4 petaflops and a sustained LINPACK performance of 5.8 petaflops. It featured a mix of high-performance CPUs and GPUs.

=== HPC2 ===
Eni launched HPC2 in 2014, introducing a hybrid CPU-GPU architecture. The system retained the IBM iDataPlex hardware base but integrated two NVIDIA Tesla GPUs per node alongside dual Intel Xeon E5-2670 CPUs. Like its predecessor, HPC2 comprised about 1,500 nodes and used a high-speed InfiniBand network. Its peak computational power reached 4.6 petaflops, a nearly tenfold improvement over HPCC1.

=== HPCC1 ===
The HPCC1 system was deployed by Eni in 2013. It was based on IBM iDataPlex DX360M4 nodes, each equipped with two Intel Sandy Bridge Xeon E5-2670 processors running at 2.6 GHz, for a total of approximately 1,500 nodes. The system used FDR InfiniBand interconnects and reached a peak performance of 499.2 teraflops, with a LINPACK performance of 454 teraflops. HPCC1 was primarily employed in geophysical simulations and subsurface modeling for oil and gas exploration.

== Performance ==
In the June 2025 TOP500 list, HPC6 secured the 6th position globally, delivering 606.97 petaFLOPS on the High-Performance LINPACK (HPL) benchmark. This performance represents a substantial increase from the combined 70 petaFLOPS of its predecessors, HPC4 and HPC5.

In the June 2025 edition of the Green500 list, Eni's HPC6 ranked 29th, making it one of the highest-placed large-scale supercomputers in terms of energy efficiency. Taking into account only the supercomputers with more than one million computing cores, HPC6 ranks in the fifth position among the most green supercomputers in the world.

== Applications ==
Eni mainly utilizes its HPC systems for:

- Geosciences: processing seismic data and modeling subsurface structures for oil and gas exploration.
- Energy transition: simulating carbon dioxide storage processes, developing advanced batteries, and researching renewable energy solutions.
- Artificial intelligence: implementing AI algorithms for predictive maintenance, operational optimization, and data analysis.
