= PEZY Computing =

Japanese fabless computer chip designing company

- Industry: CPU design
- Founded: 2010
- Headquarters: Tokyo, Japan
- Website: pezy.co.jp

PEZY Computing is a Japanese fabless computer chip design company specialising in the design of manycore processors for supercomputers.

== History ==
PEZY Computing was founded in 2010 and is headquartered in Tokyo, Japan. The name "PEZY" is an acronym derived from the Greek metric prefixs peta-, exa-, zetta-, and yotta-.

The company develops manycore processors for high-performance computing. Its first processor, the PEZY-1, was introduced in 2012, followed by the PEZY-SC, launched 2014.

In 2015, computers using PEZY processors occupied the top three positions on the Green 500 supercomputer list. One of the most efficient being RIKEN's Shoubu computer with 7.03 GFLOPS/Watt.

The company has collaborated with other technology firms, including a 2016 partnership with Imagination Technologies to integrate MIPS-based CPUs with PEZY's manycore processors for high performance computing applications.

In early 2017, the PEZY-SC2 chip was launched. In November 2017 the Gyoukou supercomputer was unveiled, incorporating PEZY-SC2 chips.

In December 2017, president Motoaki Saito, and employee, Daisuke Suzuki, were arrested on fraud charges related to inflated expense claims submitted to Japan's New Energy and Industrial Technology Development Organization (NEDO). Subsequent investigations identified additional improperly obtained subsidies, and in 2018 Suzuki received a suspended prison sentence for his involvement.

On 21 December 2022, PEZY began a partnership with proteanTecs based out of Israel.
