= TOP500 =

Database project devoted to the ranking of computers

- Key people: Erich Strohmaier; Jack Dongarra; Horst D. Simon; Hans Meuer
- Established: 24 June 1993; 33 years ago
- Website: top500.org

The TOP500 project ranks and details the 500 most powerful non-distributed computer systems in the world. The project was started in 1993 and publishes an updated list of the supercomputers twice a year. The first of these updates always coincides with the International Supercomputing Conference in June, and the second is presented at the ACM/IEEE Supercomputing Conference in November. The project aims to provide a reliable basis for tracking and detecting trends in high-performance computing and bases rankings on HPL benchmarks, a portable implementation of the high-performance LINPACK benchmark written in Fortran for distributed-memory computers.

The most recent edition of TOP500 was published in June 2026. As of June 2026, China's LineShine is the most powerful supercomputer in the TOP500, reaching 2,198 petaFlops on the LINPACK benchmarks. As of submitted data until June 2026, the United States has the highest number of systems with 161 supercomputers; Japan is in second place with 44, and Germany is the third place with 41; the United States has by far the highest share of total computing power on the list (37.5%). Due to secrecy of the latest Chinese programs, publicly known supercomputer performance share in China represents only 2% that of global as of June 2025.

The TOP500 list is compiled by Jack Dongarra of the University of Tennessee, Knoxville, Erich Strohmaier and Horst Simon of the National Energy Research Scientific Computing Center (NERSC) and Lawrence Berkeley National Laboratory (LBNL), and, until his death in 2014, Hans Meuer of the University of Mannheim, Germany. The TOP500 project also includes lists such as Green500 (measuring energy efficiency) and HPCG (measuring I/O bandwidth).

== History ==
Rapid growth of supercomputer performance, based on data from the top500.org website. The logarithmic y-axis shows performance in GFLOPS. Combined performance of 500 largest supercomputers Fastest supercomputer Supercomputer in 500th place

In the early 1990s, a new definition of supercomputer was needed to produce meaningful statistics. After experimenting with metrics based on processor count in 1992, the idea arose at the University of Mannheim to use a detailed listing of installed systems as the basis. In early 1993, Jack Dongarra was persuaded to join the project with his LINPACK benchmarks. A first test version was produced in May 1993, partly based on data available on the Internet, including the following sources:

- "List of the World's Most Powerful Computing Sites" maintained by Gunter Ahrendt
- David Kahaner, the director of the Asian Technology Information Program (ATIP); published a report in 1992, titled "Kahaner Report on Supercomputer in Japan" which had an immense amount of data.

The information from those sources was used for the first two lists. Since June 1993, the TOP500 is produced semiannually based on site and vendor submissions only. Since 1993, performance of the No. 1 ranked position has grown steadily in accordance with Moore's law, doubling roughly every 14 months. In June 2018, Summit was fastest with an Rpeak of 187.6593 PFLOPS. For comparison, this is over 1,432,513 times faster than the Connection Machine CM-5/1024 (1,024 cores), which was the fastest system in November 1993 (twenty-five years prior) with an Rpeak of 131.0 GFLOPS.

In 2019, for the first time, all 500 systems deliver a petaflop [sic] or more on the High Performance Linpack (HPL) benchmark, with the entry level to the list now at 1.022 petaflops." However, for a different benchmark "Summit and Sierra remain the only two systems to exceed a petaflop [sic] on the HPCG benchmark, delivering 2.9 petaflops and 1.8 petaflops, respectively. The average HPCG result on the current list is 213.3 teraflops, a marginal increase from 211.2 six months ago.

In June 2022, the top 4 systems of Graph500 used both AMD CPUs and AMD accelerators. After an upgrade, for the 56th TOP500 in November 2020, Fugaku grew its HPL performance to 442 petaflops, a modest increase from the 416 petaflops the system achieved when it debuted in June 2020. More significantly, the ARMv8.2 based Fugaku increased its performance on the new mixed precision HPC-AI benchmark to 2.0 exaflops, besting its 1.4 exaflops mark recorded six months ago. These represent the first benchmark measurements above one exaflop for any precision on any type of hardware.

Summit, a previously fastest supercomputer, was highest-ranked IBM-made supercomputer; with IBM POWER9 CPUs. Sequoia became the last IBM Blue Gene/Q model to drop completely off the list; it had been ranked 10th on the 52nd list (and 1st on the June 2012, 41st list, after an upgrade). Summit was decommissioned on November 15, 2024.

== Architecture and operating systems ==
Share of processor families in TOP500 supercomputers by year

As of June 2022, all supercomputers on TOP500 are 64-bit supercomputers, mostly based on CPUs with the x86-64 instruction set architecture, 384 of which are Intel EMT64-based and 101 of which are AMD AMD64-based, with the latter including the top eight supercomputers. 15 other supercomputers are all based on RISC architectures, including six based on ARM64 and seven based on the Power ISA used by IBM Power microprocessors.

In recent years, heterogeneous computing has dominated the TOP500, mostly using Nvidia's graphics processing units (GPUs) or Intel's x86-based Xeon Phi as coprocessors. This is because of better performance per watt ratios and higher absolute performance. AMD GPUs have taken the top 1 and displaced Nvidia in top 10 part of the list. The recent exceptions include the aforementioned Fugaku, Sunway TaihuLight, and K computer. Tianhe-2A is also an exception, as US sanctions prevented use of the Xeon Phi; instead, it was upgraded to use the Chinese-designed Matrix-2000 accelerators.

Two computers which first appeared on the list in November 2018 were based on architectures new to the TOP500. The Advanced Computing System(PreE) was a new x86-64 microarchitecture from Chinese manufacturer Sugon, using Hygon Dhyana CPUs and was ranked 38th. The Astra was the first ARM-based computer on the list, using Cavium ThunderX2 CPUs. Before the ascendancy of 32-bit x86 and later 64-bit x86-64 in the early 2000s, a variety of RISC processor families made up most TOP500 supercomputers, including SPARC, MIPS, PA-RISC, and Alpha.

Share of operating systems families in TOP500 supercomputers by time trend

All the fastest supercomputers since the Earth Simulator supercomputer have used operating systems based on Linux. Since November 2017, all the listed supercomputers use an operating system based on the Linux kernel.

Since November 2015, no computer on the list runs Windows. In November 2014, the Faenov Windows Azure cloud computer was no longer on the list of fastest supercomputers (its best rank was 165th in 2012), leaving the Shanghai Supercomputer Center's Magic Cube as the only Windows-based supercomputer on the list, until it also dropped off the list. It was ranked 436th in its last appearance on the list released in June 2015, while its best rank was 11th in 2008. There are no longer any Mac OS computers on the list. It had at most five such systems at a time, one more than the Windows systems that came later, while the total performance share for Windows was higher. Their relative performance share of the whole list was however similar, and never high for either. In November 2004, the System X supercomputer based on Mac OS X (Xserve, with 2,200 PowerPC 970 processors) ranked 7th place.

The last MIPS system dropped off the list in 2003 though the Gyoukou supercomputer that jumped to 4th place in November 2017 had a MIPS-based design as a small part of the coprocessors. Use of 2,048-core coprocessors (plus 8× 6-core MIPS, for each, that "no longer require to rely on an external Intel Xeon E5 host processor") made the supercomputer much more energy efficient than the other top 10: it was 5th on Green500 and other such ZettaScaler-2.2-based systems take the first three spots. At 19.86 million cores, it was by far the largest system by core-count, with almost double that of the then-best manycore system, the Chinese Sunway TaihuLight.

== TOP500 ==
As of June 2026, the number one supercomputer is LineShine, the leader on Green500 is KAIROS, a Bull Sequana XH3000 system using the Nvidia Grace Hopper GH200 Superchip. EuroHPC's Jupiter became Europe's first system to reach the exascale milestone.

Microsoft is back on the TOP500 list with six Microsoft Azure instances (that use/are benchmarked with Ubuntu, so all the supercomputers are still Linux-based), with CPUs and GPUs from same vendors, the fastest one currently 7th.

Top 10 positions of the 67th TOP500 in June 2026
Rank (previous)	Rmax Rpeak^{(PetaFLOPS)}	Name	Model	CPU cores	Accelerator (e.g. GPU) cores	Total cores (CPUs + accelerators)	Interconnect	Site country	Year
1	2,198.40; 2,735.82	LineShine	LingKun	13,789,440 (45,360 × 304-core Huawei LX2-ARMv9 @1.55 GHz)	-	13,789,440	LingQi	National Supercomputing Centre in Shenzhen (NSCS); China	2025
2 ▼	1,809.00; 2,821.10	El Capitan	HPE Cray EX255a	1,080,000 (45,000 × 24-core Optimized 4th Generation EPYC 24C @1.8 GHz)	10,260,000 (45,000 × 228 AMD Instinct MI300A)	11,340,000	Slingshot-11	Lawrence Livermore National Laboratory; United States	2024
3 ▼	1,353.00; 2,055.72	Frontier	HPE Cray EX235a	614,656 (9,604 × 64-core Optimized 3rd Generation EPYC 64C @2.0 GHz)	8,451,520 (38,416 × 220 AMD Instinct MI250X)	9,066,176	Slingshot-11	Oak Ridge National Laboratory; United States	2022
4 ▼	1,012.00; 1,980.01	Aurora	HPE Cray EX	1,104,896 (21,248 × 52-core Intel Xeon Max 9470 @2.4 GHz)	8,159,232 (63,744 × 128 Intel Max 1550)	9,264,128	Slingshot-11	Argonne National Laboratory; United States	2023
5 ▼	1,000.00; 1,226.28	Jupiter	BullSequana XH3000	1,694,592 (23,536 × 72-Arm Neoverse V2 cores Nvidia Grace @3 GHz)	3,106,752 (23,536 × 132 Nvidia Hopper H100)	4,801,344	Quad-rail NVIDIA NDR200 Infiniband	EuroHPC JU; European Union, Jülich, Germany	2025
6	571.50; 861.13	HPC7	HPE Cray EX255a	329,664 (13,736 × 24-core Optimized 4th Generation EPYC 24C @1.8 GHz)	3,131,808 (13,736 × 228 AMD Instinct MI300A)	3,461,472	Slingshot-11	Eni S.p.A; European Union, Ferrera Erbognone, Italy	2026
7 ▼	561.20; 846.84	Eagle	Microsoft NDv5	172,800 (3,600 × 48-core Intel Xeon Platinum 8480C @2.0 GHz)	1,900,800 (14,400 × 132 Nvidia Hopper H100)	2,073,600	NVIDIA InfiniBand NDR	Microsoft; United States	2023
8 ▼	477.90; 606.97	HPC6	HPE Cray EX235a	213,120 (3,330 × 64-core Optimized 3rd Generation EPYC 64C @2.0 GHz)	2,930,400 (13,320 × 220 AMD Instinct MI250X)	3,143,520	Slingshot-11	Eni S.p.A; European Union, Ferrera Erbognone, Italy	2024
9 ▼	442.01; 537.21	Fugaku	Supercomputer Fugaku	7,630,848 (158,976 × 48-core Fujitsu A64FX @2.2 GHz)	-	7,630,848	Tofu interconnect D	Riken Center for Computational Science; Japan	2020
10 ▼	434.90; 574.84	Alps	HPE Cray EX254n	748,800 (10,400 × 72-Arm Neoverse V2 cores Nvidia Grace @3.1 GHz)	1,372,800 (10,400 × 132 Nvidia Hopper H100)	2,121,600	Slingshot-11	CSCS Swiss National Supercomputing Centre; Switzerland	2024

== Top countries ==
Numbers below represent the number of computers in the TOP500 that are in each of the listed countries or territories. As of 2026, United States has the most supercomputers on the list, with 163 machines. The United States has the highest aggregate computational power at 7,400 Petaflops Rmax with China second (2,357 Pflop/s) and Japan third (1,584 Pflop/s).

Distribution of supercomputers in the TOP500 list by country (as of November 2026)
Country or territory	Number of systems
United States	163
European Union	136
Germany	47
Japan	46
South Korea	22
Italy	20
France	20
China	18
Canada	16
United Kingdom	13
Taiwan	11
Brazil	10
Sweden	9
Saudi Arabia	8
Poland	8
Netherlands	7
India	7
Singapore	7
Norway	7
United Arab Emirates	6
Finland	5
Russia	5
Australia	4
Switzerland	3
Spain	3
Israel	3
Austria	3
Vietnam	2
Kazakhstan	2
Slovakia	2
Thailand	2
Turkey	2
Czechia	2
Slovenia	2
Ireland	2
Greece	1
South Africa	1
Denmark	1
Iceland	1
Luxembourg	1
Belgium	1
Argentina	1
Bulgaria	1
Uzbekistan	1
Portugal	1
Morocco	1
Hungary	1
Indonesia	1

== Other rankings ==
Distribution of supercomputers in the TOP500 list by country and by year
Country / Region	Nov 2026	Jun 2026	Nov 2025	Jun 2025	Nov 2024	Jun 2024	Nov 2023	Jun 2023	Nov 2022	Jun 2022	Nov 2021	Jun 2021	Nov 2020	Jun 2020	Nov 2019	Jun 2019	Nov 2018	Jun 2018	Nov 2017	Jun 2017	Nov 2016	Jun 2016	Nov 2015	Jun 2015	Nov 2014	Jun 2014	Nov 2013	Jun 2013	Nov 2012	Jun 2012	Nov 2011	Jun 2011	Nov 2010	Jun 2010	Nov 2009	Jun 2009	Nov 2008	Jun 2008	Nov 2007	Jun 2007	Nov 2006
United States	163	161	171	175	173	171	161	150	127	128	149	122	113	113	117	116	109	124	143	168	171	165	199	233	231	232	264	252	251	252	263	255	274	282	277	291	290	257	283	281	309
EU	136	131	126	128	129	123	112	103	101	92	83	93	79	79	87	92	91	93	86	99	95	93	94	122	110	103	89	97	89	96	95	109	108	126	137	134	140	169	133	115	82
Germany	47	41	40	41	40	40	36	36	34	31	26	23	17	16	16	13	17	21	21	28	31	26	33	37	26	22	20	19	19	20	20	30	26	24	27	29	25	46	31	24	18
Japan	46	44	43	39	34	29	32	33	31	33	32	34	34	29	29	28	31	36	35	33	27	29	37	40	32	30	28	30	32	35	30	26	26	18	16	15	17	22	20	23	30
South Korea	22	19	15	15	13	13	12	8	8	6	7	5	3	3	3	5	6	7	5	8	4	7	10	9	9	8	5	4	4	3	3	4	3	1	2	0	1	1	1	5	6
Italy	20	18	18	17	14	11	12	7	7	6	6	6	6	7	5	5	6	5	6	8	6	5	4	4	3	5	5	6	7	8	4	5	6	7	6	6	11	6	6	5	8
France	20	21	23	25	24	24	23	24	24	22	19	16	18	19	18	20	18	18	18	18	20	18	18	27	30	27	22	23	21	22	23	25	26	27	26	23	26	34	17	13	12
China	18	31	40	47	63	80	104	134	162	173	173	188	214	226	228	220	227	206	202	160	171	168	109	37	61	76	63	66	72	68	74	61	41	24	21	21	15	12	10	13	18
Canada	16	17	19	13	9	10	10	10	10	14	11	11	12	13	9	8	9	6	5	6	1	1	6	6	6	9	10	9	11	10	9	8	6	7	9	8	2	2	5	10	8
United Kingdom	13	11	9	13	14	16	15	14	15	12	11	11	12	10	11	18	20	22	15	17	13	11	18	29	30	30	23	29	24	25	27	27	25	38	45	44	46	53	48	42	30
Taiwan	11	11	10	8	7	6	5	2	2	2	2	2	3	2	2	2	2	1	1	0	0	0	0	1	1	1	1	1	3	3	2	2	0	0	0	1	2	3	11	10	2
Brazil	10	10	10	9	9	8	9	9	8	6	5	6	4	4	3	3	1	1	0	2	3	4	6	6	4	4	3	3	2	3	2	2	2	1	1	0	2	1	1	2	4
Sweden	9	9	8	9	8	7	6	6	6	5	4	3	2	2	2	2	4	3	5	5	4	5	3	5	5	3	5	7	6	4	3	5	6	8	7	10	8	9	7	10	1
Saudi Arabia	8	8	7	6	7	8	7	6	6	6	6	6	5	3	3	3	3	4	4	6	5	5	6	7	4	4	3	4	3	3	3	4	6	4	4	2	0	0	0	2	4
Poland	8	8	8	7	8	8	4	3	3	5	4	4	2	1	1	1	4	4	5	6	7	6	6	7	2	2	2	3	4	5	6	5	6	5	3	4	6	3	1	0	0
Netherlands	7	7	7	7	10	9	10	8	8	6	11	16	15	15	15	13	6	9	6	4	3	3	2	3	5	5	3	2	0	0	0	1	2	4	3	3	3	5	6	8	2
India	7	7	6	6	6	4	4	4	3	3	3	3	3	2	2	3	4	5	4	4	5	9	11	11	9	9	12	11	8	5	2	2	4	5	3	6	8	6	9	8	10
Singapore	7	7	5	5	4	3	3	3	3	3	1	4	4	4	4	5	3	2	1	1	1	1	0	0	0	0	0	0	0	1	1	2	2	1	1	1	0	0	1	2	2
Norway	7	8	9	9	6	5	5	4	3	2	1	3	3	3	2	0	1	1	1	1	1	1	1	2	3	3	3	3	3	3	0	1	3	2	2	2	2	2	3	2	3
United Arab Emirates	6	5	5	4	3	2	1	1	2	2	2	2	2	2	2	0	0	0	0	0	0	0	0	0	0	0	0	0	0	1	0	0	0	0	0	0	0	0	0	1	1
Finland	5	5	3	3	3	3	3	3	3	4	3	2	2	2	1	2	1	1	2	3	2	5	2	2	3	2	2	2	3	1	1	2	1	3	2	1	1	1	5	3	1
Russia	5	5	5	6	6	7	7	7	7	7	7	3	2	2	3	2	3	4	3	3	5	7	7	8	9	5	5	8	8	5	5	12	11	11	8	5	8	9	7	5	2
Australia	4	4	4	4	4	5	6	5	5	5	3	2	2	2	3	5	5	5	4	4	3	5	4	6	9	6	5	5	7	6	4	6	4	1	1	1	1	1	1	4	4
Switzerland	3	3	3	4	5	5	3	4	4	4	3	3	3	2	2	4	2	3	3	3	4	3	6	6	7	6	5	4	4	1	3	4	4	5	5	4	4	6	7	5	5
Spain	3	3	3	3	3	3	3	1	1	1	1	1	1	1	2	2	2	2	1	1	1	1	2	2	2	2	2	3	2	4	3	2	3	3	6	5	6	7	9	6	7
Israel	3	3	3	1	1	0	0	0	0	0	0	0	0	0	0	0	0	0	0	0	0	0	0	1	2	2	2	2	1	3	3	2	0	2	2	1	1	0	0	0	2
Austria	3	3	2	2	3	2	2	2	2	2	1	1	1	1	1	1	0	0	2	3	3	5	1	1	1	1	1	1	1	1	2	2	1	2	8	5	0	0	0	0	0
Vietnam	2	2	1	1	0	0	0	0	0	0	0	0	0	0	0	0	0	0	0	0	0	0	0	0	0	0	0	0	0	0	0	0	0	0	0	0	0	0	0	1	0
Kazakhstan	2	2	2	0	0	0	0	0	0	0	0	0	0	0	0	0	0	0	0	0	0	0	0	0	0	0	0	0	0	0	0	0	0	0	0	0	0	0	0	0	0
Slovakia	2	2	1	0	0	0	0	0	0	0	0	0	0	0	0	0	0	0	0	0	0	0	0	0	0	0	0	0	0	0	0	0	0	0	0	0	0	0	0	0	0
Thailand	2	2	2	2	2	1	1	1	1	0	0	0	0	0	0	0	0	0	0	0	0	0	0	0	0	0	0	0	0	0	0	0	0	0	0	0	0	0	0	0	0
Turkey	2	2	2	2	2	1	0	0	0	0	0	0	0	0	0	0	0	0	0	0	0	0	0	0	0	0	0	0	0	0	0	0	0	1	0	0	0	0	2	1	1
Czechia	2	3	3	3	3	3	2	2	2	2	2	2	1	1	1	1	1	1	1	1	1	1	1	1	0	0	0	0	0	0	0	0	0	0	0	0	0	0	0	0	0
Slovenia	2	2	2	2	2	2	2	2	2	2	2	2	0	0	0	0	0	0	0	0	0	0	0	0	0	0	0	0	0	0	0	0	1	1	1	1	1	1	0	0	0
Ireland	2	2	2	2	4	4	4	5	5	3	1	14	14	14	14	13	12	7	4	2	1	3	0	0	0	1	2	0	0	3	3	1	1	1	1	1	1	1	0	0	1
Greece	1	1	0	0	0	0	0	0	0	0	0	0	0	0	0	0	0	0	0	0	0	0	0	1	0	0	0	0	0	0	0	0	0	0	0	0	0	0	0	0	0
South Africa	1	1	0	0	0	0	0	0	0	0	0	0	0	0	0	3	2	1	1	1	1	1	0	0	0	0	0	0	0	1	1	0	0	1	1	0	1	0	0	1	2
Denmark	1	1	1	1	1	0	0	0	0	0	0	0	0	0	0	1	0	0	0	2	2	2	2	2	2	1	1	1	1	1	2	2	2	3	0	0	3	0	1	0	1
Iceland	1	1	1	1	1	1	0	0	0	0	0	0	0	0	0	0	0	0	0	0	0	0	0	0	0	0	0	0	0	0	0	0	0	0	0	0	0	0	0	0	0
Luxembourg	1	1	1	1	1	2	2	2	2	2	2	2	0	0	0	0	0	0	0	0	0	0	0	0	0	0	0	0	0	0	0	0	0	0	0	0	0	0	1	0	0
Belgium	1	2	1	1	1	1	1	1	1	0	0	0	0	0	0	0	0	0	0	1	1	2	0	1	1	2	1	1	1	2	1	2	2	0	1	1	2	2	1	4	1
Argentina	1	1	1	1	1	1	1	0	0	0	0	0	0	0	0	0	0	0	0	0	0	0	0	0	0	0	0	0	0	0	0	0	0	0	0	0	0	0	0	0	0
Bulgaria	1	1	1	2	2	2	2	1	1	1	1	1	0	0	0	0	0	0	0	0	0	0	1	1	0	0	0	0	0	0	0	0	0	0	1	1	1	0	0	0	0
Uzbekistan	1	1	0	0	0	0	0	0	0	0	0	0	0	0	0	0	0	0	0	0	0	0	0	0	0	0	0	0	0	0	0	0	0	0	0	0	0	0	0	0	0
Portugal	1	1	1	1	1	1	0	0	0	0	0	0	0	0	0	0	0	0	0	0	0	0	0	0	0	0	0	0	0	0	0	0	0	0	0	0	0	0	0	0	0
Morocco	1	1	1	1	1	1	1	1	1	1	1	1	1	0	0	0	0	0	0	0	0	0	0	0	0	0	0	0	0	0	0	0	0	0	0	0	0	0	0	0	0
Hungary	1	1	1	1	1	1	1	1	1	1	0	0	0	0	0	0	0	0	0	0	0	0	1	1	1	0	0	0	0	0	0	0	0	0	0	0	0	0	0	0	0
Indonesia	1	1	0	0	0	0	0	0	0	0	0	0	0	0	0	0	0	0	0	0	0	0	0	0	0	0	0	0	0	0	0	0	0	0	0	0	0	0	1	1	0
Hong Kong	0	0	0	0	0	0	0	0	0	0	0	1	1	1	1	1	0	0	0	0	0	0	1	1	1	1	2	1	0	0	0	0	1	1	1	1	0	0	0	0	0
New Zealand	0	0	0	0	0	0	0	0	0	0	0	0	0	0	0	0	1	1	1	1	3	1	1	0	0	0	0	0	0	0	0	0	5	7	8	5	4	6	1	1	1
Mexico	0	0	0	0	0	0	0	0	0	0	0	0	0	0	0	0	0	0	1	0	0	0	1	1	0	0	0	0	1	0	0	0	0	0	0	1	1	0	0	2	1
Croatia	0	0	0	0	0	0	0	0	0	0	0	0	0	0	0	0	0	0	0	0	0	0	1	0	0	0	0	0	0	0	0	0	0	0	0	0	0	0	0	0	0
Malaysia	0	0	0	0	0	0	0	0	0	0	0	0	0	0	0	0	0	0	0	0	0	0	0	1	1	1	0	0	0	0	0	0	0	0	1	1	1	2	3	4	3
Slovak Republic	0	0	0	0	0	0	0	0	0	0	0	0	0	0	0	0	0	0	0	0	0	0	0	0	0	0	0	0	1	1	0	0	0	0	0	0	0	0	0	0	0
Cyprus	0	0	0	0	0	0	0	0	0	0	0	0	0	0	0	0	0	0	0	0	0	0	0	0	0	0	0	0	0	0	0	0	0	0	0	0	0	1	0	0	0
Egypt	0	0	0	0	0	0	0	0	0	0	0	0	0	0	0	0	0	0	0	0	0	0	0	0	0	0	0	0	0	0	0	0	0	0	0	0	0	1	1	0	0
Philippines	0	0	0	0	0	0	0	0	0	0	0	0	0	0	0	0	0	0	0	0	0	0	0	0	0	0	0	0	0	0	0	0	0	0	0	0	0	0	0	1	0

=== Fastest supercomputer in TOP500 by country ===
(As of June 2026)

Country/Territory	Fastest supercomputer of country/territory (name)	Rank in TOP500	Rmax Rpeak (PFlop/s)	Site
United States	El Capitan	2	1,809.00; 2,821.10	Lawrence Livermore National Laboratory
Japan	Fugaku	9	442.01; 537.21	RIKEN
Finland	LUMI	11	379.70; 531.51	Center for Scientific Computing
Israel	Israel-1	59	41.50; 52.68	Yokneam
Italy	HPC7	6	571.50; 861.13	Eni S.p.A.
Spain	MareNostrum	16	175.30; 249.44	Barcelona Supercomputing Center
China	LineShine	1	2,198.40; 2,735.82	National Supercomputing Centre in Shenzhen (NSCS)
Netherlands	ISEG-2	15	202.40; 338.49	Nebius
France	CEA-HE	29	90.79; 171.26	CEA
Germany	Jupiter	5	1,000.00; 1,226.28	Forschungszentrum Jülich
Saudi Arabia	Shaheen III	22	122.80; 155.21	King Abdullah University of Science and Technology
South Korea	NIPA()-CL1	20	137.40; 156.48	NHN Cloud
Australia	Setonix	81	27.16; 35.00	Pawsey Supercomputing Centre
Sweden	Arrhenius GPU	42	66.82; 84.02	EuroHPC/NAISS (National Academic Infrastructure for Supercomputing in Sweden)
Russia	Chervonenkis	101	21.53; 29.42	Yandex
Switzerland	Alps	10	434.90; 574.84	Swiss National Supercomputing Centre
United Kingdom	Isambard-AI phase 2	13	216.50; 278.58	University of Bristol
Brazil	Harpia	37	75.20; 141.00	Petróleo Brasileiro S.A
Taiwan	Nano 4	33	81.55; 117.92	National Center for High-Performance Computing
Luxembourg	MeluXina - Accelerator Module	177	10.52; 15.29	LuxProvide
India	PowerEdge XE9680	32	84.31; 102.82	Shakti Cloud, Yotta Data Services Private Limited
Thailand	THE CRUST 2.5	146	13.85; 21.68	PTT Exploration and Production
Canada	Sovereign AI Factory	95	22.74; 27.44	Telus Communications
UAE	SuperPOD	46	55.81; 87.27	Group 42
Czechia	C24	215	8.40; 8.87	Škoda Auto
Poland	Helios GPU	116	19.14; 30.44	Cyfronet
Norway	Olivia (GPU)	154	13.20; 16.80	UNINETT Sigma2 AS
Bulgaria	Discoverer	316	4.52; 5.94	Consortium Petascale Supercomputer Bulgaria
Argentina	Clementina XXI	289	5.39; 12.58	Servicio Meteorológico Nacional
Slovenia	VEGA HPC CPU	364	3.82; 5.37	IZUM
Ireland	AIC1	381	3.55; 6.97	Software Company MIR
Singapore	ASPIRE 2B (GPU Partition)	44	66.40; 105.98	National Supercomputing Centre Singapore
Morocco	Toubkal	409	3.16; 5.01	Mohammed VI Polytechnic University - African Supercomputing Centre
Hungary	Komondor	434	3.10; 4.51	Governmental Information Technology Development Agency (KIFÜ)
Austria	MUSICA Phase 1	75	31.84; 53.76	Austrian Scientific Computing (ASC)
Belgium	Sofia	222	8.19; 12.17	Vrije Universiteit Brussel

=== Systems ranked No. 1 ===
- Shenzhen Cloud Computing Center LineShine (National Supercomputing Centre in Shenzhen (NSCS) China, June 2026 – Present)
- HPE Cray El Capitan (Lawrence Livermore National Laboratory United States, November 2024 – June 2026)
- HPE Cray Frontier (Oak Ridge National Laboratory United States, June 2022 – November 2024)
- Supercomputer Fugaku (Riken Center for Computational Science Japan, June 2020 – June 2022)
- IBM Summit (Oak Ridge National Laboratory United States, June 2018 – June 2020)
- NRCPC Sunway TaihuLight (National Supercomputing Center in Wuxi China, June 2016 – November 2017)
- NUDT Tianhe-2A (National Supercomputing Center of Guangzhou China, June 2013 – June 2016)
- Cray Titan (Oak Ridge National Laboratory United States, November 2012 – June 2013)
- IBM Sequoia Blue Gene/Q (Lawrence Livermore National Laboratory United States, June 2012 – November 2012)
- Fujitsu K computer (Riken Advanced Institute for Computational Science Japan, June 2011 – June 2012)
- NUDT Tianhe-1A (National Supercomputing Center of Tianjin China, November 2010 – June 2011)
- Cray Jaguar (Oak Ridge National Laboratory United States, November 2009 – November 2010)
- IBM Roadrunner (Los Alamos National Laboratory United States, June 2008 – November 2009)
- IBM Blue Gene/L (Lawrence Livermore National Laboratory United States, November 2004 – June 2008)
- NEC Earth Simulator (Earth Simulator Center Japan, June 2002 – November 2004)
- IBM ASCI White (Lawrence Livermore National Laboratory United States, November 2000 – June 2002)
- Intel ASCI Red (Sandia National Laboratories United States, June 1997 – November 2000)
- Hitachi CP-PACS (University of Tsukuba Japan, November 1996 – June 1997)
- Hitachi SR2201 (University of Tokyo Japan, June 1996 – November 1996)
- Fujitsu Numerical Wind Tunnel (National Aerospace Laboratory of Japan Japan, November 1994 – June 1996)
- Intel Paragon XP/S140 (Sandia National Laboratories United States, June 1994 – November 1994)
- Fujitsu Numerical Wind Tunnel (National Aerospace Laboratory of Japan Japan, November 1993 – June 1994)
- TMC CM-5 (Los Alamos National Laboratory United States, June 1993 – November 1993)

=== Additional statistics ===
By number of systems as of November 2026:

Top five accelerators/co-processors
Accelerator	Systems
NVIDIA HOPPER H200 SXM5 141 GB (Launched: 2022)	28
NVIDIA HOPPER H100 SXM5 80 GB (Launched: 2022)	25
NVIDIA AMPERE A100 (Launched: 2020)	23
NVIDIA HOPPER GH200 Superchip (Launched: 2022)	22
NVIDIA HOPPER H100 (Launched: 2022)	18

Top five manufacturers by system quantity
Manufacturer	Systems
Hewlett Packard Enterprise	126
Lenovo	119
Bull	57
DELL	52
Nvidia	35

Top five operating systems
Operating System	Systems
Linux	111
HPE Cray OS	37
Red Hat Enterprise Linux	33
CentOS	23
Ubuntu 22.04	14

Note: All operating systems of the TOP500 systems are Linux-family based, but Linux above is generic Linux.

The oldest system is currently the Sunway TaihuLight. It initially appeared on the 47th list in June 2016 with a Rmax of 93.0 petaFLOPS ranked as no. 1. This system is currently on the 27th place.

CTyun HPC - shanghai15 is the system with the most CPU cores (66,630,000). CTyun HPC - shanghai15 has the most GPU/accelerator cores (66,560,000). LineShine is the system with the greatest power consumption with 42,220 kilowatts.

== New developments in supercomputing ==
In November 2014, it was announced that the United States was developing two new supercomputers to exceed China's Tianhe-2 in its place as world's fastest supercomputer. The two computers, Sierra and Summit, will each exceed Tianhe-2's 55 petaflops peak. Summit, the more powerful of the two, will deliver 150–300 petaflops peak. On 10 April 2015, US government agencies banned selling chips, from Nvidia to supercomputing centers in China as "acting contrary to the national security ... interests of the United States"; and Intel Corporation from providing Xeon chips to China due to their use, according to the US, in researching nuclear weapons – research to which US export control law bans US companies from contributing – "The Department of Commerce refused, saying it was concerned about nuclear research being done with the machine."

On 29 July 2015, President Obama signed an executive order creating a National Strategic Computing Initiative calling for the accelerated development of an exascale (1000 petaflops) system and funding research into post-semiconductor computing.

In June 2016, Japanese firm Fujitsu announced at the International Supercomputing Conference that its future exascale supercomputer will feature processors of its own design that implement the ARMv8 architecture. The Flagship2020 program, by Fujitsu for RIKEN plans to break the exaflops barrier by 2020 through the Fugaku supercomputer, (and "it looks like China and France have a chance to do so and that the United States is content – for the moment at least – to wait until 2023 to break through the exaflops barrier.") These processors will also implement extensions to the ARMv8 architecture equivalent to HPC-ACE2 that Fujitsu is developing with Arm.

In June 2016, Sunway TaihuLight became the No. 1 system with 93 petaflops (PFLOPS) on the Linpack benchmark.

In November 2016, Piz Daint was upgraded, moving it from 8th to 3rd, leaving the US with no systems under the TOP3 for the 2nd time.

Inspur, based out of Jinan, China, is one of the largest HPC system manufacturers. As of May 2017, Inspur has become the third manufacturer to have manufactured a 64-way system – a record that has previously been held by IBM and HP. The company has registered over $10B in revenue and has provided a number of systems to countries such as Sudan, Zimbabwe, Saudi Arabia and Venezuela. Inspur was also a major technology partner behind both the Tianhe-2 and Taihu supercomputers, occupying the top 2 positions of the TOP500 list up until November 2017. Inspur and Supermicro released a few platforms aimed at HPC using GPU such as SR-AI and AGX-2 in May 2017.

In June 2018, Summit, an IBM-built system at the Oak Ridge National Laboratory (ORNL) in Tennessee, US, took the No. 1 spot with a performance of 122.3 petaflops (PFLOPS), and Sierra, a very similar system at the Lawrence Livermore National Laboratory, CA, US took #3. These systems also took the first two spots on the HPCG benchmark. Due to Summit and Sierra, the US took back the lead as consumer of HPC performance with 38.2% of the overall installed performance while China was second with 29.1% of the overall installed performance. For the first time ever, the leading HPC manufacturer was not a US company. Lenovo took the lead with 23.8% of systems installed. It is followed by HPE with 15.8%, Inspur with 13.6%, Cray with 11.2%, and Sugon with 11%.

On 18 March 2019, the United States Department of Energy and Intel announced the first exaFLOPS supercomputer would be operational at Argonne National Laboratory by the end of 2021. The computer, named Aurora, was delivered to Argonne by Intel and Cray.

On 7 May 2019, The U.S. Department of Energy announced a contract with Cray to build the "Frontier" supercomputer at Oak Ridge National Laboratory. Frontier, originally anticipated to be operational in 2021, was projected to be the world's most powerful computer, with a peak performance of greater than 1.5 exaflops.

Since June 2019, all TOP500 systems deliver one petaflops or more on the High Performance Linpack (HPL) benchmark, with the entry level to the list now at 1.022 petaflops.

In May 2022, the Frontier supercomputer broke the exascale barrier, completing more than a quintillion 64-bit floating point arithmetic calculations per second. Frontier clocked in at approximately 1.1 exaflops, beating out the previous record-holder, Fugaku. In June 2024, Aurora was the second computer on the TOP500 to post an exascale Rmax value, at 1.012 exaflops.

Since then, Frontier has been dethroned by El Capitan, hosted at Lawrence Livermore National Laboratory, with an HPL score of 1.742 exaflops.

== Large machines not on the list ==
Some major systems are not on the list. A prominent example is the NCSA's Blue Waters which publicly announced the decision not to participate in the list because they do not feel it accurately indicates the ability of any system to do useful work.

Other organizations decide not to list systems for security and/or commercial competitiveness reasons. One such example is the National Supercomputing Center at Qingdao's OceanLight supercomputer, completed in March 2021, which was submitted for, and won, the Gordon Bell Prize. The computer is an exaflops computer, but was not submitted to the TOP500 list; the first exaflops machine submitted to the TOP500 list was Frontier. Analysts suspected that the reason the NSCQ did not submit what would otherwise have been the world's first exascale supercomputer was to avoid inflaming political sentiments and fears within the United States, in the context of the United States – China trade war. Similarly, government agencies like the National Security Agency formerly submitted their devices to the TOP500, only to stop after 1998.

Additional purpose-built machines that are not capable or do not run the benchmark were not included, such as RIKEN MDGRAPE-3 and MDGRAPE-4.

A Google Tensor Processing Unit v4 pod is capable of 1.1 exaflops of peak performance, while TPU v5p claims over 4 exaflops in Bfloat16 floating-point format, however, these units are highly specialized to run machine learning workloads and the TOP500 measures a specific benchmark algorithm using a specific numeric precision.

Tesla Dojo's primary unnamed cluster using 5,760 Nvidia A100 graphics processing units (GPUs) was touted by Andrej Karpathy in 2021 at the fourth International Joint Conference on Computer Vision and Pattern Recognition (CCVPR 2021) to be "roughly the number five supercomputer in the world" at approximately 81.6 petaflops, based on scaling the performance of the Nvidia Selene supercomputer, which uses similar components.

In March 2024, Meta AI disclosed the operation of two datacenters with 24,576 H100 GPUs, which is almost 2x as on the Microsoft Azure Eagle (#3 as of September 2024), which could have made them occupy 3rd and 4th places in TOP500, but neither have been benchmarked. During company's Q3 2024 earnings call in October, M. Zuckerberg disclosed usage of a cluster with over 100,000 H100s.

xAI Memphis Supercluster (also known as "Colossus") allegedly features 100,000 of the same H100 GPUs, which could have put it in the first place, but it is reportedly not in full operation due to power shortages.

After the onset of US-China Trade War, China has largely shrouded its newly online supercomputers and data centers in secrecy, opting out of reporting to the TOP500 list. This is partly driven by fears of being targeted by US sanctions placed on Chinese domestic suppliers. LineShine (Lingsheng or 灵晟), two exaflops at National Supercomputing Center in Shenzhen (NSCC-SZ), all hardware are made in China.

=== Computers and architectures that have dropped off the list ===
IBM Roadrunner is no longer on the list (nor is any other using the Cell coprocessor, or PowerXCell).

Although Itanium-based systems reached second rank in 2004, none now remain.

Similarly (non-SIMD-style) vector processors (NEC-based such as the Earth simulator that was fastest in 2002) have also fallen off the list. Also the Sun Starfire computers that occupied many spots in the past now no longer appear.

The last non-Linux computers on the list – the two AIX ones – running on POWER7 (in July 2017 ranked 494th and 495th, originally 86th and 85th), dropped off the list in November 2017.

== Notes ==
- The first edition of TOP500 to feature only 64-bit supercomputers was the 59th edition of TOP500, which was published in June 2022.

== See also ==
- Computer science
- Computing
- Graph500
- Green500
- HPC Challenge Benchmark
- Instructions per second
- LINPACK benchmarks
- List of fastest computers
- List of the top supercomputers in the United States
