= ISC High Performance =

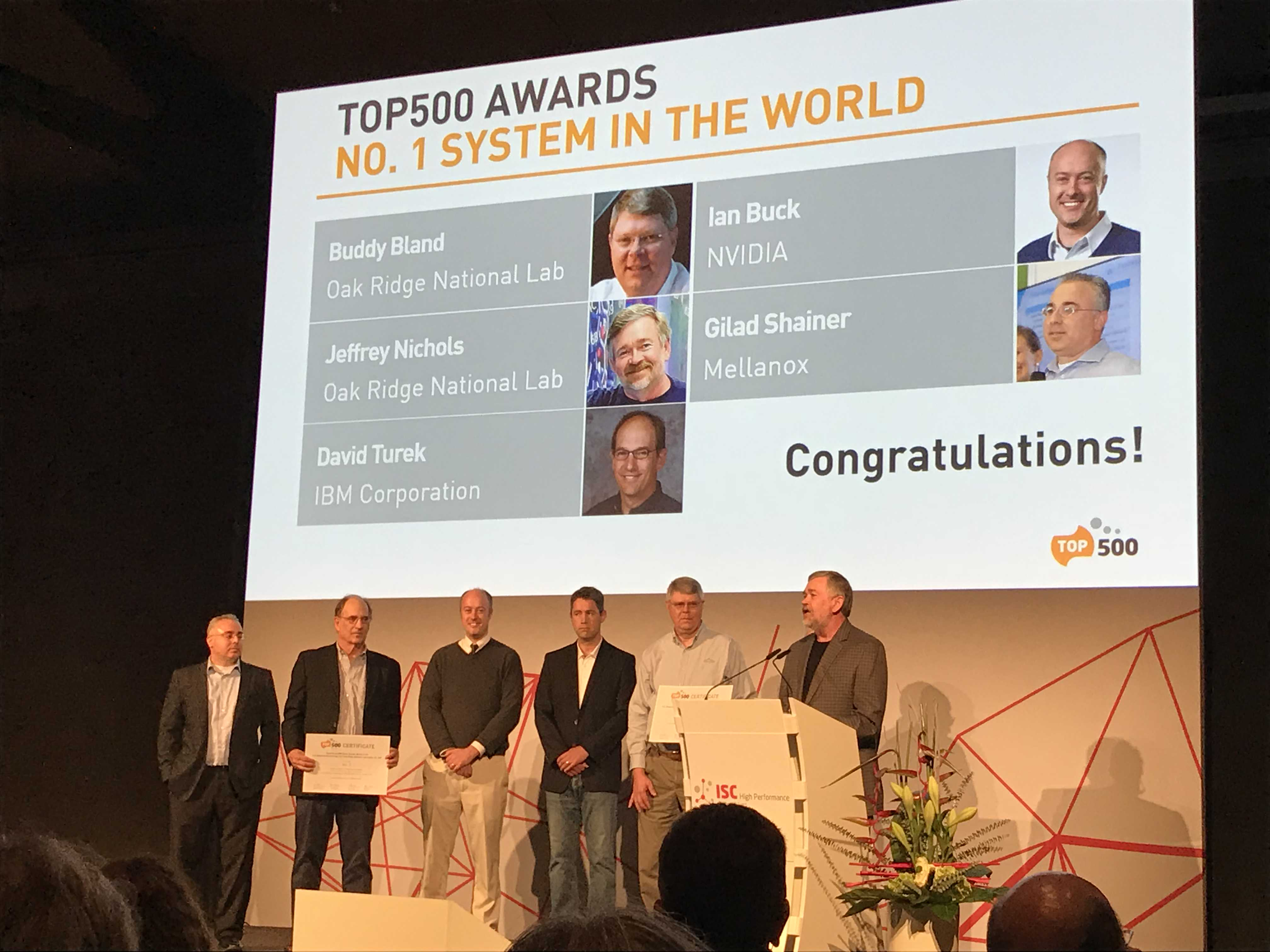
- Summit being named the world's fastest supercomputer at ISC High Performance 2018
- Status: Active
- Genre: Conferences
- Founder: Dr. Hans Werner Meuer

The ISC High Performance, formerly known as the International Supercomputing Conference, is a yearly conference on supercomputing which has been held in Europe since 1986. It stands as the oldest supercomputing conference in the world.

== History ==
In 1986 Professor Dr. Hans Werner Meuer, director of the computer centre and professor for computer science at the University of Mannheim (Germany) co-founded and organized the "Mannheim Supercomputer Seminar" which had 81 participants. This was held yearly and became the annual International Supercomputing Conference and Exhibition (ISC). In 2015, the name was officially changed to ISC High Performance. The conference is attended by speakers, vendors, and researchers from all over the world. Since 1993 the conference has been the venue for one of the twice yearly TOP500 announcements where the fastest 500 supercomputers in the world are named. The other annual announcement is in November at the SC Conference (The International Conference for High Performance Computing, Networking, Storage and Analysis) in the USA.

The conference celebrated 30 years with the 19 June 2016 meeting in Frankfurt, Germany. Its 33rd edition in 2019 attracted a record number of participants – 164 exhibitors, and 3,573 visitors from 64 countries.

Year	Location	Conference
2024	Hamburg, Germany	ISC High Performance
2023	Hamburg, Germany	ISC High Performance
2022	Hamburg, Germany	ISC High Performance
2021	online-only	ISC High Performance
2020	online-only	ISC High Performance
2019	Frankfurt, Germany	ISC High Performance
2018	Frankfurt, Germany	ISC High Performance
2017	Frankfurt, Germany	ISC High Performance
2016	Frankfurt, Germany	ISC High Performance
2015	Frankfurt, Germany	ISC High Performance
2014	Leipzig, Germany	International Supercomputing Conference
2013	Leipzig, Germany	International Supercomputing Conference
2012	Hamburg, Germany	International Supercomputing Conference
2011	Hamburg, Germany	International Supercomputing Conference
2010	Hamburg, Germany	International Supercomputing Conference
2009	Hamburg, Germany	International Supercomputing Conference
2008	Dresden, Germany	International Supercomputing Conference
2007	Dresden, Germany	International Supercomputing Conference
2006	Dresden, Germany	International Supercomputing Conference
2005	Heidelberg, Germany	International Supercomputing Conference
2004	Heidelberg, Germany	International Supercomputing Conference
2003	Heidelberg, Germany	International Supercomputing Conference
2002	Heidelberg, Germany	International Supercomputing Conference
1993	Mannheim, Germany	Mannheim Supercomputer Seminar
