= Hans Meuer =

- Born: June 7, 1936
- Died: January 20, 2014 (aged 77); Daisbach, Germany
- Education: Rheinisch Westfälische Technical University (RWTH) of Aachen
- Known for: International Supercomputing Conference, TOP500
- Scientific career
- Fields: Computer Science
- Workplaces: University of Mannheim, Prometeus GmbH.

Hans Meuer was a professor of computer science at the University of Mannheim, managing director of Prometeus GmbH and general chair of the International Supercomputing Conference. In 1986, he became co-founder and organizer of the first Mannheim Supercomputer Conference, which has been held annually but known as the International Supercomputing Conference since 2001.

Meuer served as specialist, project leader, group and department chief during his 11 years at the Jülich Research Centre, Germany. For the following 33 years, he was director of the computer center and professor for computer science at the University of Mannheim, Germany. Since 1998 - 2013, he was the managing director of Prometeus GmbH, a company that runs a series of conferences in fields closely associated with high performance computing.

Meuer studied mathematics, physics and politics at the universities of Marburg, Giessen and Vienna. In 1972, he received his doctorate in mathematics from the Rheinisch Westfälische Technical University (RWTH) of Aachen. Since 1974, he was professor of mathematics and computer science at the University of Mannheim with specialization in software engineering. For more than 20 years, he has been involved intensively in the areas of supercomputing/parallel computing.

In 1993, Meuer started the TOP500 initiative together with Erich Strohmaier, Horst Simon and Jack Dongarra.
