= Mathematics mastery =

Mathematics mastery is an approach to mathematics education which is based on mastery learning in which most students are expected to achieve a high level of competence before progressing. This technique is used in countries such as China and Singapore where good results have been achieved and so the approach is now being promoted in the UK by people such as schools minister Nick Gibb. Chinese teachers were brought to the UK to demonstrate the Shanghai mastery approach in 2015. A trial was made in the UK with about 10,000 students of ages 5–6 and 11–12. In one year, test scores indicated that the students were about a month ahead of students in schools using other approaches. This result was considered small but significant.

Mathematics mastery is a new way of thinking and teaching, where the whole class moves through content at the same pace and students are given time to think deeply about the maths. The methodology build self-confidence in learners and differentiates through depth rather than acceleration.
