= Jupiter (supercomputer) =

German supercomputer

Jupiter is an exascale supercomputer. It is located at the Forschungszentrum Jülich in Germany. It went into operation on 5 September 2025.
