= LineShine =

Chinese supercomputer

- Active: Deployment: 1H 2026; Completion: 1H 2026
- Operators: National Supercomputing Center in Shenzhen (NSCS)
- Location: Shenzhen
- Architecture: LingKun
- Power: 42.2 MW
- Operating system: Kylin OS
- Space: TBA
- Memory: 1.4515 petabytes HBM / 11.6121 petabytes DDR5
- Storage: 650 petabytes
- Speed: 2,198.40 petaFLOPS (Rmax) / 2,735.82 petaFLOPS (Rpeak)
- Cost: TBA
- Ranking: TOP500: 1st, June 2026
- Purpose: Scientific research and development
- Website: www.nsccsz.cn

LineShine (Chinese: 灵晟; pinyin: Língshèng) is a Chinese exascale supercomputer, hosted at the National Supercomputing Centre in Shenzhen (NSCS), that became operational in the first half of 2026. It is based on the LingKun architecture using LX2 CPUs. It placed first in the TOP500 and HPCG rankings in June 2026, surpassing El Capitan.

== Design ==
LineShine uses a total of 13,789,440 Huawei LX2 CPU cores, each LX2 CPU has 304 cores running at a frequency of 1.55 GHz consisting of two compute dies and has onboard HBM. Each compute die has 152 cores based on the ARMv9 architecture as its foundation with both SVE and SME. A single LX2 die has 4 NUMA domain consisting of 38 cores each, each with 4GB of HBM and 32GB of external DDR5 RAM. In total, both LX2 compute dies on the CPU would have a combined memory resource of 32GB HBM and 256GB of DDR5 RAM.

The LX2 supports FP64/FP32/FP16/INT8 in its SME and SVE units, delivering up to 60.3 TFLOPS in FP64 and 120.6 TFLOPS in FP32. Each node is interconnected via the domestically designed LingQi high-speed network utilizing a dual-plane multi-rail fat-tree topology, offering 1.6 Tb/s bandwidth per node. LingQi interconnect's fat tree has 4 layers, the single hop latency across the network is 1.07 microseconds and the entire bi-section bandwidth across it is more than 3.5 Pb/sec. Each LineShine compute cabinet consists of 2 frames, each frame has 16 compute blades containing 8 nodes with two LX2s each with a total of 16 LX2s per blade; the entire rack has 512 LX2 CPUs in total. The entire LineShine system consists of 90 compute cabinets with more than 22,000 nodes, the total power consumption is 42.22 MW with an efficiency of 52.07 FP64 GFlops/W.

== History ==
China had not made a submission to the TOP500 list since 2019 due to US sanctions and export controls on high-end GPUs. LineShine was unveiled and announced on 27 April 2026.

Records
Preceded by El Capitan; 1.7 exaFLOPS	World's most powerful supercomputer June 2026 – 2.2 exaFLOPS	Incumbent
