= TOSS (operating system) =

Linux operating system

Tri-Lab Operating System Stack
- OS family: Unix-like
- Working state: Current
- Package manager: RPM Package Manager

The Tri-Lab Operating System Stack (TOSS) is a Linux distribution based on Red Hat Enterprise Linux (RHEL) that was created to provide a software stack for high performance computing (HPC) clusters for laboratories within the National Nuclear Security Administration (NNSA). The operating system allows multiple smaller systems to emulate a high-performance computing (HPC) platform.

== Linux distribution ==
The name "tri-lab" refers to the three major NNSA labs, the Lawrence Livermore National Laboratory, the Los Alamos National Laboratory, and the Sandia National Laboratories.

The OS is used by NNSA computers including the El Capitan supercomputer and systems using ARM architecture including the ThunderX2 system on a chip (SoC). In addition to being used by the National Nuclear Security Administration (NNSA), most of the systems in NASA's High-End Computing Capability Project, part of the NASA Advanced Supercomputing Division, were migrated to TOSS in March 2022.

Many of the software packages included in TOSS are from the RHEL repository. Additional packages are built using Fedora's Koji build system to create RPM packages. The system also uses SLURM and Flux scheduling and resource management software.
