= Green500 =

Ranking of supercomputers from the TOP500 by energy efficiency

The Green500 is a biannual ranking of supercomputers, from the TOP500 list of supercomputers, in terms of energy efficiency. The list measures performance per watt using the TOP500 measure of high performance LINPACK benchmarks at double-precision floating-point format.

== History ==
The Green500 List was created by Kirk W. Cameron and Wu-chun Feng, then both associate professors in Computer Science at Virginia Tech, in 2006. The power measurement techniques that form the basis of the run rules were based on Cameron's early work in supercomputer energy efficiency initially funded by the National Science Foundation (Awards: #0347683, #0614705). The first Green500 List was presented at the 2007 ACM/IEEE conference on Supercomputing and described in the December issue of IEEE Computer 40(12): 50-55 (2007).

The list was initially met with some controversy since several key stakeholders (e.g., SGI, DOE Laboratories) failed to submit measurements by the report deadlines and were deprecated in the original list using power estimates based on U/L Ratings. A revised list was posted in February 2008 to enable those failing to submit to provide updates to the list. Successive, updated Green500 Lists followed independently twice per year, in June at the International Supercomputing Conference (ISC) in Europe and in November at the US-based ACM/IEEE Supercomputing conference. In 2014, the Green500 List merged with the Top500 List and now requires only a single submission to participate in both lists.

As of November 2012, an Appro International, Inc. Xtreme-X supercomputer (Beacon) topped the Green500 list with 2.499 LINPACK GFLOPS/W. Beacon is deployed by NICS of the University of Tennessee and is a GreenBlade GB824M, Xeon E5-2670 based, eight cores (8C), 2.6 GHz, Infiniband FDR, Intel Xeon Phi 5110P computer.

As of June 2013, the Eurotech supercomputer Eurora at Cineca topped the Green500 list with 3.208 LINPACK GFLOPS/W. The Cineca Eurora supercomputer is equipped with two Intel Xeon E5-2687W CPUs and two PCI-e connected NVIDIA Tesla K20 accelerators per node. Water cooling and electronics design allows for very high densities to be reached with a peak performance of 350 TFLOPS per rack.

As of November 2014, the L-CSC supercomputer of the Helmholtz Association at the GSI in Darmstadt Germany topped the Green500 list with 5.271 GFLOPS/W and was the first cluster to surpass an efficiency of 5 GFLOPS/W. It runs on Intel Xeon E5-2690 Processors with the Intel Ivy Bridge Architecture and AMD FirePro S9150 GPU Accelerators. It uses in rack watercooling and Cooling Towers to reduce the energy required for cooling.

As of August 2015, the Shoubu supercomputer of RIKEN outside Tokyo Japan topped the Green500 list with 7.032 GFLOPS/W. The then-top three supercomputers of the list used PEZY-SC accelerators (GPU-like that use OpenCL) by PEZY Computing with 1,024 cores each and 6–7 GFLOPS/W efficiency.

As of June 2019, DGX SaturnV Volta, using "NVIDIA DGX-1 Volta36, Xeon E5-2698v4 20C 2.2GHz, Infiniband EDR, NVIDIA Tesla V100", tops Green500 list with 15.113 GFLOPS/W, while ranked only 469th on Top500. It is only slightly more efficient than the much larger Summit (which ranked 2nd while 1st on Top500 with 14.719 GFLOPS/W), using IBM POWER9 CPUs combined with Nvidia Tesla V100 GPUs.

In June 2022, Hewlett Packard Enterprise took the lead, with all-AMD systems (CPUs and GPUs) in the 4 top positions, with the top position being over 50% more efficient than the previous year's top position. Later, in Nov. 2022, Lenovo took the lead, with a small Intel-Nvidia system.

== Green 500 List ==
Top 10 positions of GREEN500 in November 2026
Rank	Performance per watt^{(GFLOPS/watt)}	Name	Model Processors, GPU, Interconnect	Vendor	Site Country, year	Rmax^{(PFLOPS)}
1	73.282	KAIROS	BullSequana XH3000; Grace Hopper Superchip 72C 3 GHz, Nvidia GH200 Superchip, Quad-Rail NVIDIA, InfiniBand NDR200	EVIDEN (ex-Atos)	CALMIP, University of Toulouse, CNRS, France, 2025	3.05
2	70.912	ROMEO-2025	BullSequana XH3000; Grace Hopper Superchip 72C 3 GHz, NVIDIA GH200 Superchip, Quad-Rail NVIDIA, InfiniBand NDR200	EVIDEN (ex-Atos)	ROMEO HPC Center, University of Reims Champagne-Ardenne; France, 2024	9.86
3	69.426	Levante GPU extension	BullSequana XH3000; GH Superchip 72C 3 GHz, NVIDIA GH200 Superchip, Quad-Rail NVIDIA InfiniBand NDR200,	EVIDEN (ex-Atos)	DKRZ, , Germany, 2025	6.75
4	68.835	Isambard-AI phase 1	HPE Cray EX254n; NVIDIA Grace 72C 3.1 GHz, NVIDIA GH200 Superchip, Slingshot-11	Hewlett Packard Enterprise	University of Bristol, United Kingdom, 2024	7.42
5	68.177	Otus (GPU only)	ThinkSystem SD665-N V3; AMD EPYC 9655 96C 2.6 GHz, NVIDIA H100 SXM5 80GB, Infiniband NDR	Lenovo	Paderborn University PC2, Germany, 2025	4.66
6	68.053	Capella	Lenovo ThinkSystem SD650 V3; AMD EPYC 9334 32C 2.7 GHz, Nvidia H100 SXM5 94Gb, Infiniband NDR200	MEGWARE	TU Dresden ZIH, Germany, 2024	24.06
7	67.251	SSC-24 Energy Module	HPE Cray XD670; Xeon Gold 6430 32C 2.1 GHz, NVIDIA H100 SXM5 80GB, Infiniband NDR400	Hewlett Packard Enterprise	Samsung Electronics, Korea, 2025	3.82
8	66.948	Helios GPU	HPE Cray EX254n; NVIDIA Grace 72C 3.1 GHz, NVIDIA GH200 Superchip, Slingshot-11	Hewlett Packard Enterprise	Cyfronet, Poland, 2024	19.14
9	66.464	AMD Ouranos	BullSequana XH3000; AMD 4th Gen EPYC 24C 1.8 GHz, AMD Instinct MI300A, Infiniband NDR200	EVIDEN (ex-Atos)	Atos, France, 2025	2.99
10	66.277	Portage	HPE Cray EX255a; AMD 4th Gen EPYC 24C 1.8 GHz, AMD Instinct MI300A, Slingshot-11	Hewlett Packard Enterprise	Chippewa Falls, United States, 2025	24.50

== Historical development ==
Energy efficiency of top-ranked computers (gigaflops/watt)

(from 2013 to 2026)
