= Tianhe-2 =

Supercomputer in Guangzhou, China

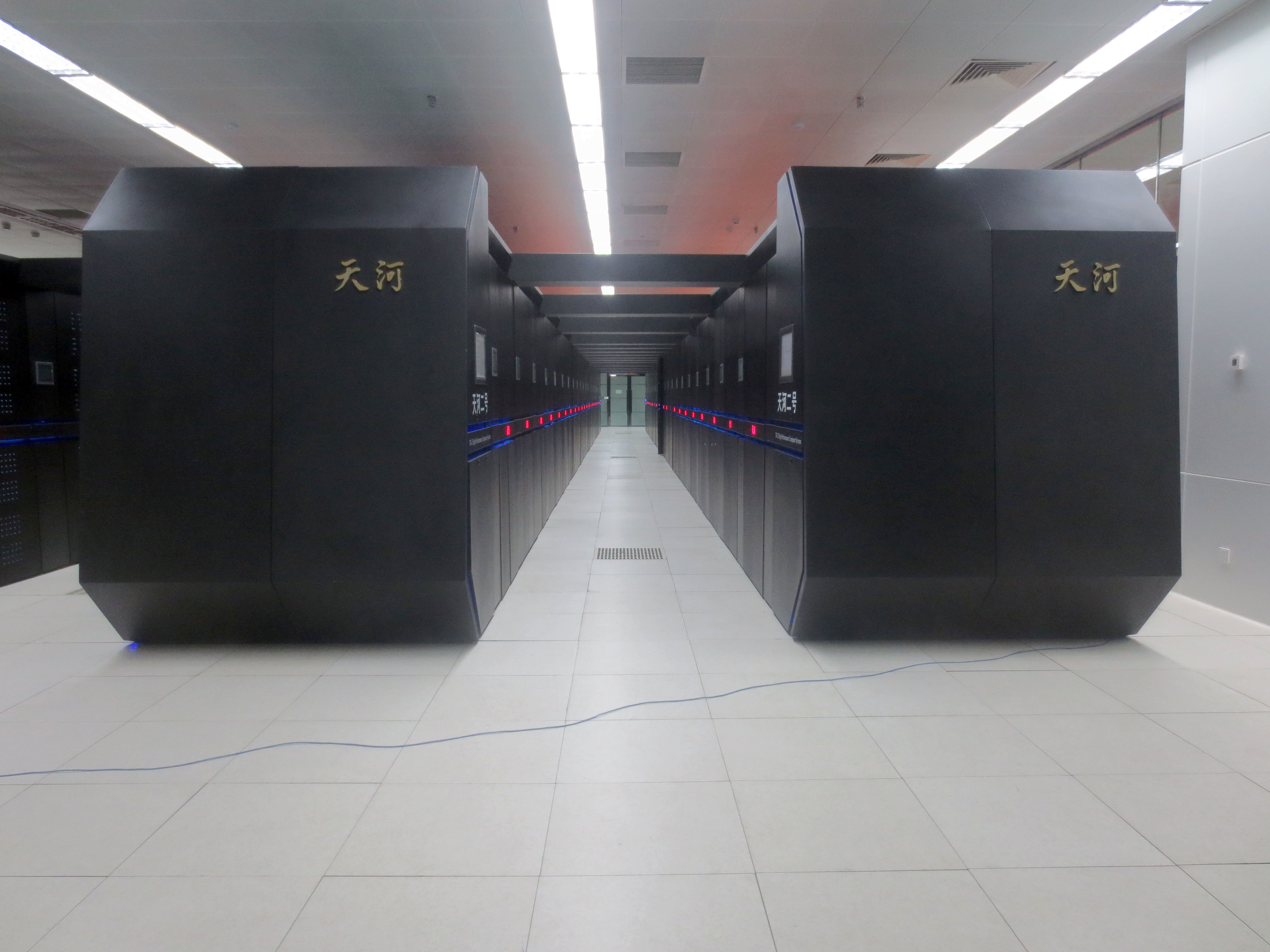
- Sponsors: 863 Program
- Location: National Supercomputer Center, Guangzhou, China
- Architecture: 32,000 Intel Xeon E5-2692 12C with 2.200 GHz 48,000 Xeon Phi 31S1P
- Power: 17.6 MW (24 MW with cooling)
- Operating system: Kylin Linux
- Memory: 1,375 TiB (1,000 TiB CPU and 375 TiB coprocessor)
- Storage: 12.4 PB
- Speed: 33.86 PFLOPS
- Cost: 2.4 billion Yuan (US$390,000,000)
- Purpose: Simulation, analysis, and government security applications.

Tianhe-2 or TH-2 (Chinese: 天河-2; pinyin: tiānhé-èr; lit. 'Heavenriver-2', i.e. 'Milky Way 2') is a 33.86- petaflops supercomputer located in the National Supercomputer Center in Guangzhou, China. It was developed by a team of 1,300 scientists and engineers.

It was the world's fastest supercomputer according to the TOP500 lists for June 2013, November 2013, June 2014, November 2014, June 2015, and November 2015. The record was surpassed in June 2016 by the Sunway TaihuLight. In 2015, plans by Sun Yat-sen University in collaboration with Guangzhou district and city administration to double its computing capacities were stopped by a U.S. government rejection of Intel's application for an export license for the CPUs and coprocessor boards.

In response to the U.S. sanctions, China introduced the Sunway TaihuLight supercomputer in 2016, which at the time of its introduction substantially outperformed Tianhe-2 (and also affected the update of Tianhe-2 to Tianhe-2A, replacing U.S. tech), and as of 2022 was no longer ranked among the top systems in the TOP500 list while using completely domestic technology including the Sunway manycore microprocessor.

== History ==
The development of Tianhe-2 was sponsored by the 863 High Technology Program, initiated by the Chinese government, the government of Guangdong province, and the government of Guangzhou city. It was built by China's National University of Defense Technology (NUDT) in collaboration with the Chinese IT firm Inspur. Inspur manufactured the printed circuit boards and helped with the installation and testing of the system software. The project was originally scheduled for completion in 2015, but was instead declared operational in June 2013. As of June 2013, the supercomputer had yet to become fully operational. It was expected to reach its full computing capabilities by the end of 2013.

In June 2013, Tianhe-2 topped the TOP500 list of fastest supercomputers in the world and was still listed as the fastest machine in the November 2015 list. The computer beat out second-place finisher Titan by nearly a 2-to-1 margin. Titan, which is housed at the United States Department of Energy's Oak Ridge National Laboratory, achieved 17.59 petaflops, while Tianhe-2 achieved 33.86 petaflops. Tianhe-2's performance returned the title of the world's fastest supercomputer to China after Tianhe-I's début in November 2010. The Institute of Electrical and Electronics Engineers said Tianhe-2's win "symbolizes China's unflinching commitment to the supercomputing arms race". In June 2013, China housed 66 of the top 500 supercomputers, second only to the United States' 252 systems. The Chinese total increased to 168 of the top 500 systems by June 2016, overtaking the United States which fell to 165 of the top 500 supercomputers.

Graph500 is an alternate list of top supercomputers based on a benchmark testing analysis of graphs. In their benchmark, the system tested at 2,061 gigaTEPS (traversed edges per second). The top system, IBM Sequoia, tested at 15,363 gigaTEPS. It also holds first place in the HPCG benchmark test proposed by Jack Dongarra, with 0.580 HPCG PFLOPS in June 2014.

Tianhe-2 has been housed at National University of Defense Technology.

== Specifications ==
According to NUDT, Tianhe-2 would have been used for simulation, analysis, and government security applications.

With 16,000 computer nodes, each comprising two Intel Ivy Bridge Xeon processors and three Xeon Phi coprocessor chips, it represented the world's largest installation of Ivy Bridge and Xeon Phi chips, counting a total of 3,120,000 cores (because of US sanctions, the upgrades Tianhe-2A switched out the Xeon Phi accelerators for Matrix-2000, and the upgraded faster system has 4,981,760 cores in total, but it still dropped from 2nd to 4th place because of newer, faster systems added to the list). Each of the 16,000 nodes possessed 88 gigabytes of memory (64 used by the Ivy Bridge processors, and 8 gigabytes for each of the Xeon Phi processors). The total CPU plus coprocessor memory was 1,375 TiB (approximately 1.34 PiB). The system has a 12.4 PiB H^{2}FS file system consisting of IO forwarding nodes providing a 1 TiB/s burst rate backed by a Lustre file system with 100 GiB/s sustained throughput.

During the testing phase, Tianhe-2 was laid out in a non-optimal confined space. When assembled at its final location, the system will have had a theoretical peak performance of 54.9 petaflops. At peak power consumption, the system itself would have drawn 17.6 megawatts of power. Including external cooling, the system drew an aggregate of 24 megawatts. The completed computer complex would have occupied 720 square meters of space.

The front-end system consisted of 4096 Galaxy FT-1500 CPUs, a SPARC derivative designed and built by NUDT. Each FT-1500 has 16 cores and a 1.8 GHz clock frequency. The chip has a performance of 144 gigaflops and runs on 65 watts. The interconnect, called the TH Express-2, designed by NUDT, utilized a fat tree topology with 13 switches each of 576 ports.

Tianhe-2 ran on Kylin Linux, a version of the operating system developed by NUDT. Resource management is based on Slurm Workload Manager.

== Criticisms ==
Researchers have criticized Tianhe-2 for being difficult to use. "It is at the world's frontier in terms of calculation capacity, but the functionality of the supercomputer is still way behind the ones in the US and Japan", says Chi Xuebin, deputy director of the Computer Network and Information Centre. "Some users would need years or even a decade to write the necessary code", he added.

The location of Tianhe-2 is in Southern China, where the warmer weather and thus higher average temperatures could increase electricity consumption by about 10% compared with a location in Northern China.

== See also ==
- Tianhe-1
- Supercomputing in China

Records
Preceded by Titan; 17.59 petaflops	World's most powerful supercomputer June 2013 – June 2016	Succeeded by Sunway TaihuLight; 93.01 petaflops
