= Michael A. Heroux =

American computer scientist and mathematician

- Born: Michael Allen Heroux
- Education: Colorado State University
- Known for: Trilinos, Kokkos, HPCG benchmark, Mantevo, Extreme-scale Scientific Software Stack (E4S)
- Awards: SIAM Fellow (2019); IEEE Computer Society Outstanding Service and Contribution Award (2023); SIAM Activity Group on Supercomputing Career Prize (2026)
- Scientific career
- Fields: Computer science, applied mathematics, high-performance computing
- Workplaces: Sandia National Laboratories; ParaTools, Inc. Saint John's University (Minnesota); Hewlett Packard Enterprise

Michael Allen Heroux is an American computer scientist and applied mathematician known for his contributions to open-source software for high-performance computing (HPC). He is the founder of the Trilinos scientific software libraries, a co-creator of the High Performance Conjugate Gradients (HPCG) Benchmark, and the founder of the Kokkos performance-portability programming model and the Mantevo miniapp suite. He was Director of Software Technology for the U.S. Department of Energy's Exascale Computing Project (ECP) from 2017 to 2024.

== Education ==
Heroux received a B.A. in mathematics from Saint John's University in Minnesota in May 1984, an M.S. in mathematics from Colorado State University in 1986, and a Ph.D. in mathematics from Colorado State University in 1989.

== Career ==
Heroux worked at Cray Research from October 1988 to May 1998, where he developed algorithms and software for the Cray Scientific Libraries and contributed to the development of the Basic Linear Algebra Subprograms (BLAS), a de facto standard for linear algebra computation.

He joined Sandia National Laboratories in 1998, where he worked as a senior scientist until his retirement in 2024. At Sandia, he founded and led the Trilinos project, a widely used collection of open-source scientific software libraries, first described in a seminal 2005 paper on which Heroux was lead author. Trilinos won a 2004 R&D 100 Award ("This pearl is a real gem"), for which Heroux was the principal investigator. He also founded the Mantevo project, an open-source suite of miniapps for co-design of scientific computing hardware and software; Mantevo received a 2013 R&D 100 Award ("Miniapps Pick Up the Pace"), with Heroux listed as principal developer alongside collaborators from Los Alamos National Laboratory, Lawrence Livermore National Laboratory, the UK Atomic Weapons Establishment, NVIDIA, the University of Warwick, and the University of Bristol. He is also a co-developer of the HPCG benchmark, an official companion metric to the TOP500 supercomputer rankings, alongside Jack Dongarra and Piotr Luszczek of the University of Tennessee. He additionally founded the Kokkos performance-portability programming model and the Extreme-scale Scientific Software Stack (E4S).

From 2017 to 2024, Heroux served as Director of Software Technology for the U.S. Department of Energy's Exascale Computing Project (ECP), coordinating software-stack development across national laboratories, universities, and industry partners in support of the first U.S. exascale supercomputers, Frontier and Aurora.

He has long held a concurrent appointment as Scientist in Residence in the Computer Science Department at Saint John's University in Minnesota. Since retiring from Sandia in 2024, he has been Senior Research Scientist at ParaTools, Inc., where he leads the Partnering for Scientific-software Ecosystem Stewardship Opportunities (PESO) project, a follow-on to ECP's software technology efforts; he is also a Visiting Scholar at Hewlett Packard Enterprise and a contributing analyst for Hyperion Research.

Heroux served as Editor-in-Chief of the ACM journal ACM Transactions on Mathematical Software from 2011 to 2016, was a Subject Area Editor for the Journal of Parallel and Distributed Computing (2012–2016), and an Associate Editor of the SIAM Journal on Scientific Computing (2010–2015). With Lois Curfman McInnes of Argonne National Laboratory, he co-founded the Extreme-scale Scientific Software Development Kit (xSDK), a community collection of interoperable math libraries. He is a member of the ACM Publications Board and, as of 2026, co-chair (with Bhavani Thuraisingham) of its New Publications Committee, in which capacity he initiated the creation of ACM's Transactions on AI for Science journal.

== Awards and honors ==
- R&D 100 Award, for Trilinos (2004), as principal investigator
- R&D 100 Award, for Mantevo (2013), as principal developer
- Fellow, Society for Industrial and Applied Mathematics (2019), "for research, leadership, and community building in software and algorithms for scientific and high-performance computing"
- Distinguished Member, Association for Computing Machinery
- Senior Member, IEEE
- IEEE Computer Society Outstanding Service and Contribution Award (2023), "for outstanding service to the high-performance computing community, and significant contributions to the performance and sustainability of scientific software"
- SIAM Activity Group on Supercomputing Career Prize (2026), "for his transformative contributions to high-performance numerical algorithms and software"
- HPCwire "People to Watch" (2015)
- HPCwire 35 HPC Legends, Class of 2025, "Open Source HPC Software Pioneer"
- U.S. Department of Energy Secretary's Honor Award (2024), as part of the Exascale Computing Project leadership team recognized for creating "the world's first sustainable exascale ecosystem"

== Selected software projects ==
- Trilinos — collection of open-source scientific computing libraries
- HPCG benchmark — TOP500 companion supercomputer benchmark
- Kokkos — C++ performance-portability programming model
- Mantevo — open-source miniapp suite for co-design
- Extreme-scale Scientific Software Stack (E4S) — curated HPC/AI software distribution
