= John D. Little =

John D. Little may refer to:

- John Little (American football) (John D. Little, Jr., 1947–1997), American football defensive end
- John Little (academic) (John Dutton Conant Little, born 1928), professor at the Massachusetts Institute of Technology
