= R peak =

R peak, also written as R-peak and Rpeak, could refer to:

- In the QRS complex of an electrocardiogram it refers to the maximum amplitude in the R wave
- In the high performance LINPACK benchmarks of supercomputers it refers to the theoretical peak performance of the system
