= Cleve Moler =

American mathematician (1939–2026)

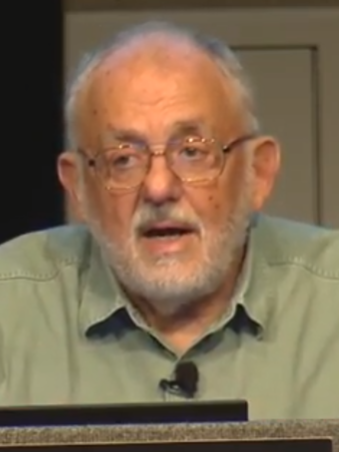
- Moler in 2017
- Born: Cleve Barry Moler; August 17, 1939; Salt Lake City, Utah, U.S.
- Died: May 20, 2026 (aged 86); Saint Michaels, Maryland, U.S.
- Education: California Institute of Technology (BS); Stanford University (PhD)
- Known for: MATLAB
- Awards: Computer Pioneer Award (2012); IEEE John von Neumann Medal (2014)
- Scientific career
- Fields: Mathematics, computer science
- Institutions: University of Michigan; Stanford University; University of New Mexico
- Thesis: Finite difference methods for the eigenvalues of Laplace's operator (1965)
- Doctoral advisor: George Forsythe
- Doctoral students: Alan Cline; Charles F. Van Loan; Jack Dongarra

Cleve Barry Moler (August 17, 1939 – May 20, 2026) was an American mathematician and computer programmer who specialized in numerical analysis. In the mid to late 1970s, he was one of the authors of LINPACK and EISPACK, Fortran libraries for numerical computing. He created MATLAB, a numerical computing package, to give his students at the University of New Mexico easy access to these libraries without writing Fortran. In 1984, he co-founded MathWorks with Jack Little to commercialize this program.

== Life and career ==
Cleve Barry Moler was born on August 17, 1939, in Salt Lake City, Utah. He received his bachelor's degree from California Institute of Technology in 1961, and a Ph.D. in 1965 from Stanford University, both in mathematics. He worked for Charles Lawson at the Jet Propulsion Laboratory in 1961 and 1962.

He was a professor of mathematics and computer science for almost 20 years at the University of Michigan, Stanford University, and the University of New Mexico. Before joining MathWorks full-time in 1989, he also worked for Intel Hypercube, where he coined the term "embarrassingly parallel", and Ardent Computer Corporation. He is also co-author of four textbooks on numerical methods and was a member of the Association for Computing Machinery. He was president of the Society for Industrial and Applied Mathematics 2007–2008.

Moler was elected a member of the National Academy of Engineering on February 14, 1997, for conceiving and developing widely used mathematical software. He received an honorary degree from Linköping University, Sweden. He received an honorary degree of Doctor of Mathematics from the University of Waterloo in 2001. On April 30, 2004, he was named Honorary Doctor (doctor technices, honoris causa) by the Technical University of Denmark. In 2009, he was recognized by Society for Industrial and Applied Mathematics as a SIAM Fellow for his outstanding contributions to numerical analysis and software, including the invention of MATLAB. In April 2012, the IEEE Computer Society named Moler the recipient of the 2012 Computer Pioneer Award. In February 2014, IEEE awarded Moler the 2014 IEEE John von Neumann Medal. In April 2017, he was made Fellow of the Computer History Museum.

Moler died on May 20, 2026, at his home in Saint Michaels, Maryland, of complications from Parkinson’s disease at the age of 86.

== Publications ==
- Forsythe, George E., Malcolm, Michael A., Moler, Cleve B., "Computer methods for mathematical computations", Prentice-Hall Series in Automatic Computation, Prentice-Hall., Englewood Cliffs, N.J., 1977. MR 0458783 ISBN 0-13-165332-6
- Moler, Cleve B., "Numerical Computing with MATLAB", Society for Industrial and Applied Mathematics, 2004, ISBN 978-0-89871-560-6
