= Kronecker graph =

Construction for generating graphs for modeling systems

Kronecker graphs are a construction for generating graphs for modeling systems. The method constructs a sequence of graphs from a small base graph by iterating the Kronecker product. A variety of generalizations of Kronecker graphs exist.

The Graph500 benchmark for supercomputers is based on the use of a stochastic version of Kronecker graphs. Stochastic kronecker graph is a kronecker graph with each component of the matrix made by real numbers between 0 and 1. The stochastic version of kronecker graph eliminates the staircase effect, which happens due to large multiplicity of kronecker graph.
