= EISPACK =

- Original authors: Brian Smith and Jack Dongarra
- Written in: Fortran
- Type: Library
- Website: www.netlib.org/eispack/

EISPACK is a software library for numerical computation of eigenvalues and eigenvectors of matrices, written in FORTRAN. It contains subroutines for calculating the eigenvalues of nine classes of matrices: complex general, complex Hermitian, real general, real symmetric, real symmetric banded, real symmetric tridiagonal, special real tridiagonal, generalized real, and generalized real symmetric matrices. In addition, it includes subroutines to perform a singular value decomposition.

Originally written around 1972–1973, EISPACK, like LINPACK and MINPACK, originated from Argonne National Laboratory, has always been free, and aims to be portable, robust and reliable. The library drew heavily on algorithms developed by James Wilkinson, which were originally implemented in ALGOL. Brian Smith led a team at Argonne developing EISPACK, initially by translating these algorithms into FORTRAN. Jack Dongarra joined the team as an undergraduate intern at Argonne, and later went on to create LAPACK, which has largely superseded EISPACK and LINPACK.

== Documentation ==
- Smith, Brian; Boyle, James; Dongarra, Jack; Garbow, Burton; Ikebe, Y; Klema, V; Moler, Cleve (1976). Matrix Eigensystem Routines - EISPACK Guide. Lecture Notes in Computer Science 6. Springer. ISBN 978-3-540-07546-2.
- Garbow, Burton; Boyle, James; Dongarra, Jack; Moler, Cleve (1977). Matrix Eigensystem Routines - EISPACK Guide Extension. Lecture Notes in Computer Science 51. Springer. ISBN 978-3-540-08254-5.

== See also ==
- List of open-source mathematical libraries
