= MathWorks =

Company that produces mathematical computing software

Coordinates: 42.30025°N 71.35039°W

The MathWorks, Inc.
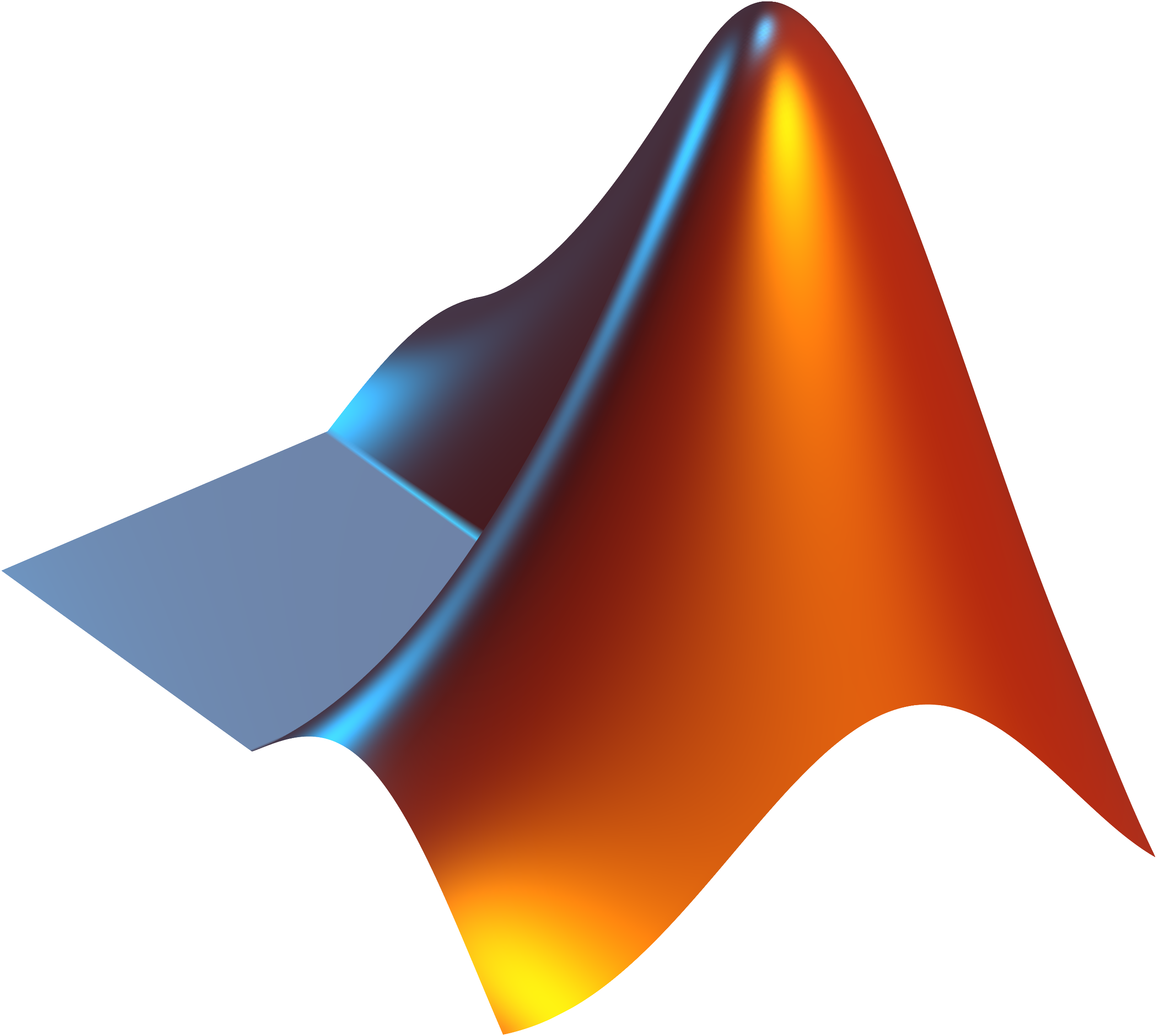
- Type: Private
- Industry: Mathematical computing software
- Founded: December 7, 1984; 41 years ago in Portola Valley, California, U.S.
- Founders: Jack Little; Cleve Moler; Steve Bangert
- Headquarters: Natick, Massachusetts, U.S.
- Area served: Worldwide
- Key people: Jack Little (CEO and President); Cleve Moler (Chief Mathematician)
- Products: MATLAB, Simulink
- Revenue: ▲US$1.5 billion (2024)
- Number of employees: 6,500 (2023)
- Website: mathworks.com

The MathWorks, Inc. is an American privately held corporation that specializes in mathematical computing software. Its major products include MATLAB and Simulink, which support data analysis and simulation.

== History ==
MATLAB (MATrix LABoratory) was created in the 1970s by Cleve Moler, who was chairman of the computer science department at the University of New Mexico at the time. It was a free tool for academics. Jack Little, who would eventually set up the company, came across the tool while he was a graduate student in electrical engineering at Stanford University.

Little and Steve Bangert rewrote the code for MATLAB in C while they were colleagues at an engineering firm. They founded MathWorks along with Moler in 1984, with Little running it out of his house in Portola Valley, California. Little would mail diskettes in baggies (food storage bags) to the first customers. The company sold its first order, 10 copies of MATLAB, for $500 to the Massachusetts Institute of Technology (MIT) in February 1985. A few years later, Little and the company moved to Massachusetts. There, Little hired Jeanne O'Keefe, an experienced computer executive, to help formalize the business. By 1997, MathWorks was profitable, claiming revenue of around $50 million, and had around 380 employees.

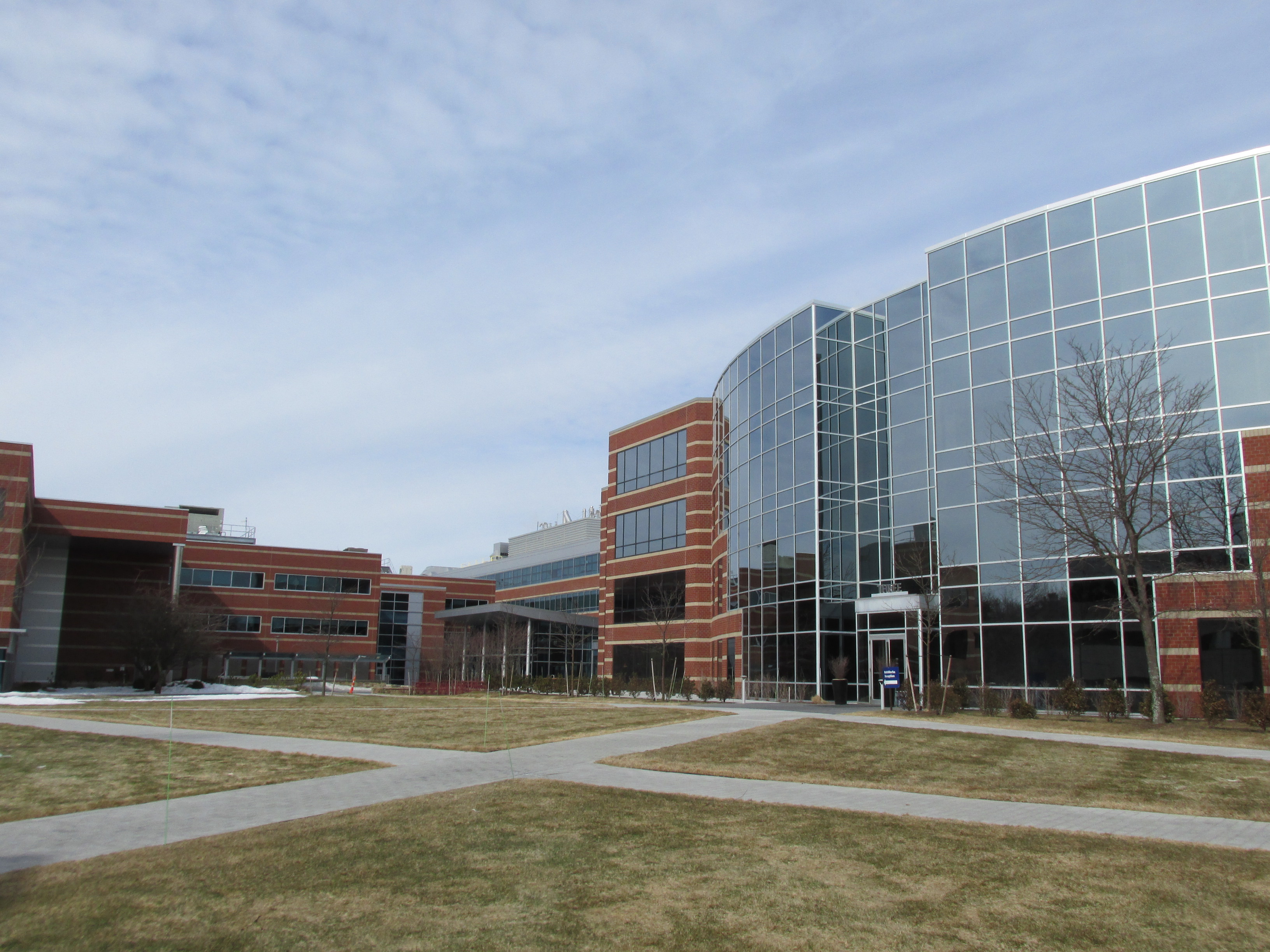
Apple Hill Campus in Natick

Since 1993 an open source alternative, GNU Octave (mostly compatible with matlab) and scilab (similar to matlab) have been available.

In 1999, MathWorks relocated to the Apple Hill office complex in Natick, Massachusetts, purchasing additional buildings in the complex in 2008 and 2009, ultimately occupying the entire campus. MathWorks expanded further in 2013 by buying Boston Scientific's old headquarters campus, which is near to MathWorks' headquarters in Natick.

By 2018, the company had around 3,000 employees in Natick and said it had revenues of around $900 million.

On May 18, 2025, MathWorks was the target of a ransomware attack which took down online applications for over a week.

== Products ==
The company's two lead products are MATLAB, which provides an environment for scientists, engineers and programmers to analyze and visualize data and develop algorithms, and Simulink, a graphical and simulation environment for model-based design of dynamic systems. MATLAB and Simulink are used in aerospace, automotive, software and other fields. The company's other products include Polyspace, SimEvents, Stateflow, and ThingSpeak.

== Corporate affairs ==
=== Intellectual property and competition ===
In 1999, the U.S. Department of Justice filed a lawsuit against MathWorks and Wind River Systems alleging that an agreement between them violated antitrust laws. The agreement in question stipulated that the two companies agreed to stop competing in the field of dynamic control system design software, with MathWorks alone selling Wind River's MATRIXx Software and that Wind River would stop all research and development and sales in that field. Both companies eventually settled with the Department of Justice and agreed to sell the MATRIXx software to a third party. MathWorks had total sales of $200 million in 2001, with dynamic control system design software accounting for half of those sales.

MathWorks's Simulink software was found to have infringed 3 patents from National Instruments related to data flow diagrams in 2003, a decision which was confirmed by a court of appeal in 2004.

In 2011, MathWorks sued AccelerEyes for copyright infringement in one court, and patent and trademark infringement in another. AccelerEyes accepted consent decrees in both cases before the trials began.

In 2012, the European Commission opened an antitrust investigation into MathWorks after competitors alleged that MathWorks refused to grant licenses to its intellectual property that would allow people to create software with interoperability with its products. The case was closed in 2014 without filing any charge.

=== Logo ===
The logo represents the first vibrational mode of a thin L-shaped membrane, clamped at the edges, and governed by the wave equation, which was the subject of Moler's thesis.

=== Community ===
The company annually sponsors a number of student engineering competitions, including EcoCAR, an advanced vehicle technology competition created by the United States Department of Energy (DOE) and General Motors (GM). MathWorks sponsored the mathematics exhibit at London's Science Museum.

In the coding community, MathWorks hosts MATLAB Central, an online exchange where users ask and answer questions and share code. MATLAB Central currently houses around than 145,000 questions in its MATLAB Answers database. The company actively supports numerous academic institutions to advance STEM education (primarily through the use of MathWorks products), including giving funding to MIT Open Courseware and MITx.
