= Graph500 =

Rating of supercomputer systems

The Graph500 is a rating of supercomputer systems, focused on data-intensive loads. The project was announced on International Supercomputing Conference in June 2010. The first list was published at the ACM/IEEE Supercomputing Conference in November 2010. New versions of the list are published twice a year. The main performance metric used to rank the supercomputers is GTEPS (giga- traversed edges per second).

Richard Murphy from Sandia National Laboratories, says that "The Graph500's goal is to promote awareness of complex data problems", instead of focusing on computer benchmarks like HPL (High Performance Linpack), which TOP500 is based on.

Despite its name, there were several hundreds of systems in the rating, growing up to 174 in June 2014.

The algorithm and implementation that won the championship is published in the paper titled "Extreme scale breadth-first search on supercomputers".

There is also list Green Graph 500, which uses same performance metric, but sorts list according to performance per Watt, like Green 500 works with TOP500 (HPL).

== Benchmark ==
The benchmark used in Graph500 stresses the communication subsystem of the system, instead of counting double precision floating-point. It is based on a breadth-first search in a large undirected graph (a model of Kronecker graph with average degree of 16). There are three computation kernels in the benchmark: the first kernel is to generate the graph and compress it into sparse structures CSR or CSC (Compressed Sparse Row/Column); the second kernel does a parallel BFS search of some random vertices (64 search iterations per run); the third kernel runs a single-source shortest paths (SSSP) computation. Six possible sizes (Scales) of graph are defined: toy (2^{26} vertices; 17 GB of RAM), mini (2^{29}; 137 GB), small (2^{32}; 1.1 TB), medium (2^{36}; 17.6 TB), large (2^{39}; 140 TB), and huge (2^{42}; 1.1 PB of RAM).

The reference implementation of the benchmark contains several versions:

- serial high-level in GNU Octave
- serial low-level in C
- parallel C version with usage of OpenMP
- two versions for Cray-XMT
- basic MPI version (with MPI-1 functions)
- optimized MPI version (with MPI-2 one-sided communications)

The implementation strategy that have won the championship on the Japanese K computer is described in.

== Top 10 ranking ==
According to June 2024 release of the list, for the BFS results section, Fugaku ranks highest, but in the SSSP results section Wuhan Supercomputer ranks highest, then Pengcheng Cloudbrain-II, then Fugaku; table shows for BFS results:

Rank	Country	Site	Machine (architecture)	Number of nodes	Number of cores	Problem scale	GTEPS
1	Japan	RIKEN Advanced Institute for Computational Science	Supercomputer Fugaku (Fujitsu A64FX)	152064	7299072	42	166029
2	China	Wuhan	Kunpeng 920+Tesla A100	252	6999552	41	115357.6
3	USA	Frontier	HPE Cray EX235a	9248	8730112	40	29654.6
4	China	Pengcheng Lab	Pengcheng Cloudbrain-II (Kunpeng 920+Ascend 910)	488	93696	40	25242.9
5	USA	DOE/SC/Argonne National Laboratory	HPE Cray EX - Intel Exascale Compute Blade	4096	25591808	40	24250.2
6	China	National Supercomputing Center in Wuxi	Sunway TaihuLight (Sunway MPP)	40768	10599680	40	23755.7

Spain (Barcelona), has a new supercomputer MareNostrum 5 ACC, ranked 8th.

=== 2022 ===
According to November 2022 release of the list:

Rank	Country	Site	Machine (architecture)	Number of nodes	Number of cores	Problem scale	GTEPS
1	Japan	RIKEN Advanced Institute for Computational Science	Supercomputer Fugaku (Fujitsu A64FX)	158976	7630848	41	102955
2	China	Pengcheng Lab	Pengcheng Cloudbrain-II (Kunpeng 920+Ascend 910)	488	93696	40	25242.9
3	China	National Supercomputing Center in Wuxi	Sunway TaihuLight (Sunway MPP)	40768	10599680	40	23755.7
4	Japan	Information Technology Center, University of Tokyo	Wisteria/BDEC-01 (PRIMEHPC FX1000)	7680	368640	37	16118
5	Japan	Japan Aerospace Exploration Agency	TOKI-SORA (PRIMEHPC FX1000)	5760	276480	36	10813
6	EU	EuroHPC/CSC	LUMI-C (HPE Cray EX)	1492	190976	38	8467.71
7	US	Oak Ridge National Laboratory	OLCF Summit (IBM POWER9)	2048	86016	40	7665.7
8	Germany	Leibniz Rechenzentrum	SuperMUC-NG (ThinkSystem SD530 Xeon Platinum 8174 24C 3.1GHz Intel Omni-Path)	4096	196608	39	6279.47
9	Germany	Zuse Institute Berlin	Lise (Intel Omni-Path)	1270	121920	38	5423.94
10	China	National Engineering Research Center for Big Data Technology and System	DepGraph Supernode (DepGraph (+GPU Tesla A100))	1	128	33	4623.379

=== 2020 ===
Arm-based Fugaku took the top spot of the list.

=== 2016 ===
According to June 2016 release of the list:

Rank	Site	Machine (architecture)	Number of nodes	Number of cores	Problem scale	GTEPS
1	Riken Advanced Institute for Computational Science	K computer (Fujitsu custom)	82944	663552	40	38621.4
2	National Supercomputing Center in Wuxi	Sunway TaihuLight (NRCPC - Sunway MPP)	40768	10599680	40	23755.7
3	Lawrence Livermore National Laboratory	IBM Sequoia (Blue Gene/Q)	98304	1572864	41	23751
4	Argonne National Laboratory	IBM Mira (Blue Gene/Q)	49152	786432	40	14982
5	Forschungszentrum Jülich	JUQUEEN (Blue Gene/Q)	16384	262144	38	5848
6	CINECA	Fermi (Blue Gene/Q)	8192	131072	37	2567
7	Changsha, China	Tianhe-2 (NUDT custom)	8192	196608	36	2061.48
8	CNRS/IDRIS-GENCI	Turing (Blue Gene/Q)	4096	65536	36	1427
8	Science and Technology Facilities Council – Daresbury Laboratory	Blue Joule (Blue Gene/Q)	4096	65536	36	1427
8	University of Edinburgh	DIRAC (Blue Gene/Q)	4096	65536	36	1427
8	EDF R&D	Zumbrota (Blue Gene/Q)	4096	65536	36	1427
8	Victorian Life Sciences Computation Initiative	Avoca (Blue Gene/Q)	4096	65536	36	1427

=== 2014 ===
According to June 2014 release of the list:

Rank	Site	Machine (architecture)	Number of nodes	Number of cores	Problem scale	GTEPS
1	RIKEN Advanced Institute for Computational Science	K computer (Fujitsu custom)	65536	524288	40	17977.1
2	Lawrence Livermore National Laboratory	IBM Sequoia (Blue Gene/Q)	65536	1048576	40	16599
3	Argonne National Laboratory	IBM Mira (Blue Gene/Q)	49152	786432	40	14328
4	Forschungszentrum Jülich	JUQUEEN (Blue Gene/Q)	16384	262144	38	5848
5	CINECA	Fermi (Blue Gene/Q)	8192	131072	37	2567
6	Changsha, China	Tianhe-2 (NUDT custom)	8192	196608	36	2061.48
7	CNRS/IDRIS-GENCI	Turing (Blue Gene/Q)	4096	65536	36	1427
7	Science and Technology Facilities Council - Daresbury Laboratory	Blue Joule (Blue Gene/Q)	4096	65536	36	1427
7	University of Edinburgh	DIRAC (Blue Gene/Q)	4096	65536	36	1427
7	EDF R&D	Zumbrota (Blue Gene/Q)	4096	65536	36	1427
7	Victorian Life Sciences Computation Initiative	Avoca (Blue Gene/Q)	4096	65536	36	1427

=== 2013 ===
According to June 2013 release of the list:

Rank	Site	Machine (architecture)	Number of nodes	Number of cores	Problem scale	GTEPS
1	Lawrence Livermore National Laboratory	IBM Sequoia (Blue Gene/Q)	65536	1048576	40	15363
2	Argonne National Laboratory	IBM Mira (Blue Gene/Q)	49152	786432	40	14328
3	Forschungszentrum Jülich	JUQUEEN (Blue Gene/Q)	16384	262144	38	5848
4	RIKEN Advanced Institute for Computational Science	K computer (Fujitsu custom)	65536	524288	40	5524.12
5	CINECA	Fermi (Blue Gene/Q)	8192	131072	37	2567
6	Changsha, China	Tianhe-2 (NUDT custom)	8192	196608	36	2061.48
7	CNRS/IDRIS-GENCI	Turing (Blue Gene/Q)	4096	65536	36	1427
7	Science and Technology Facilities Council - Daresbury Laboratory	Blue Joule (Blue Gene/Q)	4096	65536	36	1427
7	University of Edinburgh	DIRAC (Blue Gene/Q)	4096	65536	36	1427
7	EDF R&D	Zumbrota (Blue Gene/Q)	4096	65536	36	1427
7	Victorian Life Sciences Computation Initiative	Avoca (Blue Gene/Q)	4096	65536	36	1427

== See also ==
- TOP500
- Green500
- HPCG benchmark
