= John Little (academic) =

American operations researcher (1928–2024)

- Born: February 1, 1928; Boston, Massachusetts, U.S.
- Died: September 27, 2024 (aged 96)
- Education: Massachusetts Institute of Technology (BS, PhD)
- Known for: Little's law
- Spouse: Elizabeth (Betty) Alden
- Children: John N. Little (son)
- Scientific career
- Fields: Dynamic programming
- Institutions: General Electric
- Thesis: Use of Storage Water in a Hydroelectric System (1955)
- Doctoral advisor: Philip M. Morse

John Dutton Conant Little (February 1, 1928 – September 27, 2024) was an American operations researcher who was Institute Professor at the Massachusetts Institute of Technology. He was best known for his result in operations research, Little's law.

== Life and career ==
Born in Boston on February 1, 1928, he earned a B. S. in physics from Massachusetts Institute of Technology (1948) and worked at General Electric (1948–50). His Ph.D. on Use of Storage Water in a Hydroelectric System used dynamic programming, and advised by Philip M. Morse, was the first ever awarded in operations research (1955). Next, he taught at the Case Institute of Technology (now part of Case Western Reserve) from 1957 to 1962, before joining the faculty at MIT in 1962 where he since has worked. He was visiting professor at INSEAD (1988).

His earlier research in operations research involved traffic signal control, and gave him fame as he formed the Little's law in 1961. It states: "The average number of customers in a stable system (over some interval) is equal to their average arrival rate, multiplied by their average time in the system." A corollary has been added: "The average time in the system is equal to the average time in queue plus the average time it takes to receive service." Little is considered to be a founder of marketing science, having conducted fundamental research in models of individual choice behavior, adaptive control of promotional spending, and marketing mix models for consumer packaged goods. He has also started companies such as Management Decisions Systems and Kana Software. The John D. C. Little Award is awarded annually by INFORMS. He is the father of John N. Little.

Little was elected a member of the National Academy of Engineering (1989) for outstanding contributions to operational systems engineering including research, education, and applications in industry and leadership.

Little died on September 27, 2024, at the age of 96.

== Publications ==
- The Use of Storage Water in a Hydroelectric System, Journal of the Operations Research Society of America, Vol. 3, No. 2 (May, 1955), pp. 187–197
- Little, J. D. C. (1961). "A Proof for the Queuing Formula: L = λW". Operations Research. 9 (3): 383–387. doi:10.1287/opre.9.3.383. JSTOR 167570.
- Models and Managers: The Concept of a Decision Calculus, in Management Science: A Journal of the Institute for Operations Research and the Management Sciences, 16(8):466-4855, 1970
- Decision Support Systems for Marketing Managers (1984)
- The Marketing Information Revolution (Harvard Business School Press, 1994). With Robert C. Blattberg and Rashi Glazer

== Awards ==
- National Academy of Engineering electee (1989)
- Parlin and Converse Awards of the American Marketing Association
- Honorary degrees from University of Liège and University of Mons-Hainaut
- George E. Kimball Medal of the Institute for Operations Research and the Management Sciences
- Fellow of INFORMS and the American Association for the Advancement of Science
- Buck Weaver Award from MIT Sloan School of Management 2003.
