= Alan Cline =

American computer scientist and mathematician

- Born: Alan Kaylor Cline
- Occupations: Computer scientist, mathematician

Alan Kaylor Cline is an American computer scientist and mathematician. He was the David Bruton Jr. Centennial Professor #2 in the department of computer science at the University of Texas at Austin.
