= John N. Little =

Co-founder of MathWorks

John N. "Jack" Little is an American electrical engineer and, in 1984, the CEO and co-founder of MathWorks and a co-author of early versions of the company's MATLAB product.

He is a Fellow of the IEEE and a Trustee of the Massachusetts Technology Leadership Council. He holds a Bachelor's degree in Electrical Engineering from the Massachusetts Institute of Technology (1978), and a Master's degree from Stanford University (1980). He is the son of the academic John D. C. Little.
