= HPCG benchmark =

Benchmark in high-performance computing

The High Performance Conjugate Gradients Benchmark (HPCG benchmark) is a supercomputing benchmark test proposed by Michael Heroux from Sandia National Laboratories, and Jack Dongarra and Piotr Luszczek from the University of Tennessee.

== Benchmark ==
It is intended to model the data access patterns of real-world applications such as sparse matrix calculations, thus testing the effect of limitations of the memory subsystem and internal interconnect of the supercomputer on its computing performance. Because it is internally I/O bound (the data for the benchmark resides in main memory as it is too large for processor caches), HPCG testing generally achieves only a tiny fraction of the peak FLOPS the computer could theoretically deliver.

HPCG is intended to complement benchmarks such as the LINPACK benchmarks that put relatively little stress on the internal interconnect. The source of the HPCG benchmark is available on GitHub.

As of November 2024, the Fugaku supercomputer held the top spot in the HPCG performance rankings, followed by the Frontier and Aurora.

In June 2020, Summit was superseded by Fugaku with a speed of 16.0 HPCG-petaflops (an increase of 540%). Summit is currently 4th, LUMI 3rd and Frontier 2nd.

== See also ==
- Graph500
- Memory access pattern
- Preconditioned conjugate gradient method
- Traversed edges per second
