= Jack Dongarra =

American computer scientist (born 1950)

Jack Dongarra FRS
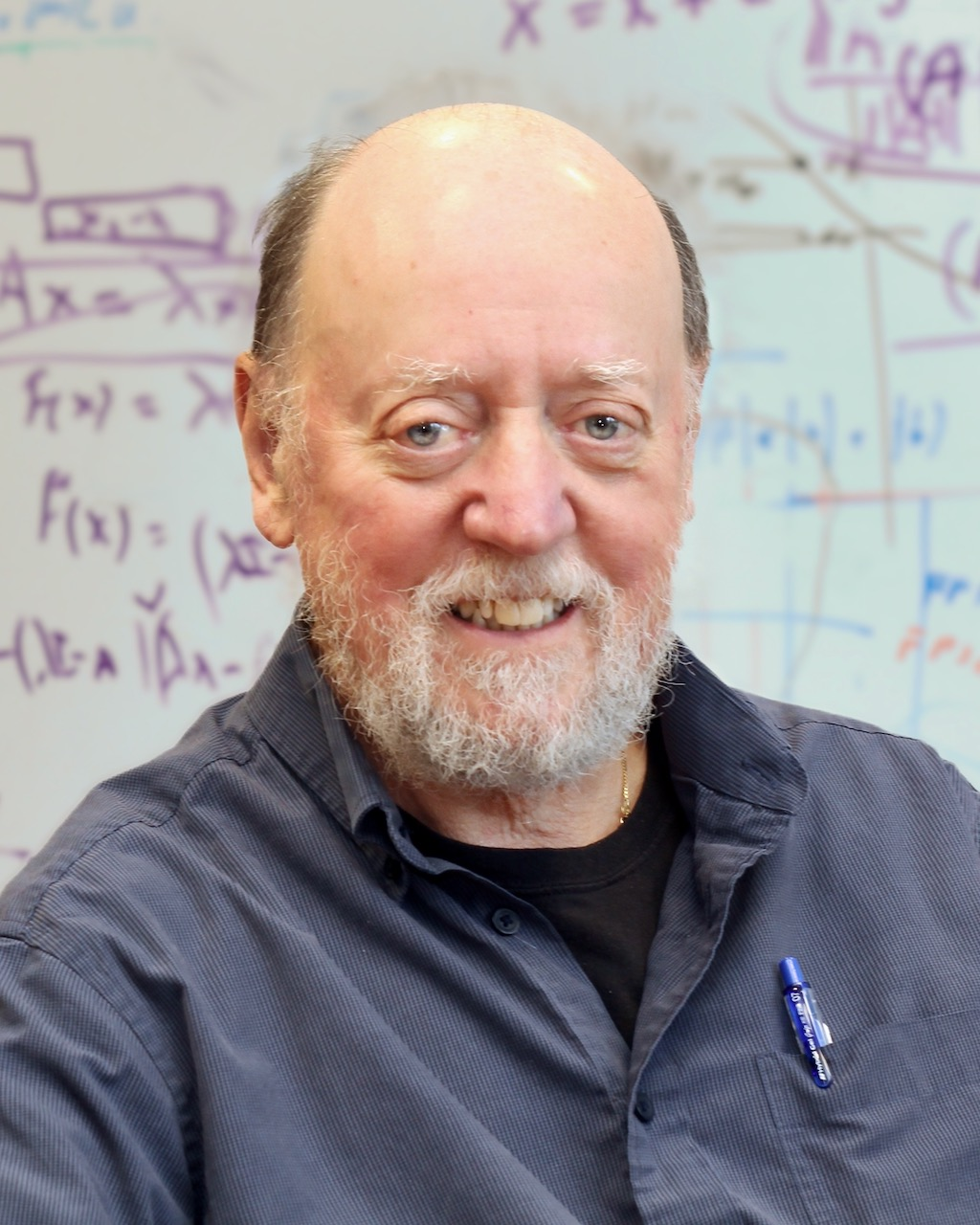
- Dongarra in 2022
- Born: July 18, 1950 (age 76); Chicago, Illinois, U.S.
- Education: Chicago State University (BS); Illinois Institute of Technology (MS); University of New Mexico (PhD)
- Known for: EISPACK, LINPACK, BLAS, LAPACK, ScaLAPACK, Netlib, PVM, MPI, NetSolve, Top500, ATLAS, and PAPI
- Awards: Member of the National Academy of Sciences (2023); ACM Turing Award (2021); IEEE Computer Pioneer Award (2020); Foreign Member of the Royal Society (2019); SIAM/ACM Prize in Computational Science and Engineering (2019); ACM/IEEE Ken Kennedy Award (2013); IEEE Charles Babbage Award (2011); SIAM SIAG/Supercomputing Career Prize (2010); SIAM Fellow (2009); IEEE Medal of Excellence in Scalable Computing (2008); IEEE Computer Society Sidney Fernbach Memorial Award (2003); Member of the National Academy of Engineering (2001); ACM Fellow (2001); IEEE Fellow (1999); Fellow of the American Association for the Advancement of Science (1994)
- Scientific career
- Fields: Computer Science; Computational science Parallel computing
- Workplaces: University of Tennessee; University of New Mexico; Rice University; Argonne National Laboratory; Oak Ridge National Laboratory; University of Manchester
- Thesis: Improving the Accuracy of Computed Matrix Eigenvalues (1980)
- Doctoral advisor: Cleve Moler
- Website: netlib.org/utk/people/JackDongarra/

Jack Joseph Dongarra FRS (born July 18, 1950) is an American computer scientist and mathematician. He is a University Distinguished Professor Emeritus of Computer Science in the Electrical Engineering and Computer Science Department at the University of Tennessee. He holds the position Turing Fellowship in the School of Mathematics at the University of Manchester, and is an adjunct professor in the Computer Science Department at Rice University. He served as a faculty fellow at the Texas A&M University Institute for Advanced Study (2014–2018). Dongarra is the founding director of the Innovative Computing Laboratory at the University of Tennessee. Dongarra received the 2021 Turing Award for pioneering contributions to numerical algorithms and software libraries that enabled high-performance computational software to keep pace with rapid advances in computer hardware over four decades.

== Education ==
Dongarra received a BSc degree in mathematics from Chicago State University in 1972 and a MSc degree in Computer Science from the Illinois Institute of Technology in 1973. In 1980, he received PhD in Applied Mathematics from the University of New Mexico under the supervision of Cleve Moler.

== Research and career ==
Dongarra worked at the Argonne National Laboratory until 1989, becoming a senior scientist. He specializes in numerical algorithms in linear algebra, parallel computing, the use of advanced computer architectures, programming methodology, and tools for parallel computers. His research includes the development, testing, and documentation of high-quality mathematical software. He has contributed to the design and implementation of the following open-source software packages and systems: EISPACK, LINPACK, the Basic Linear Algebra Subprograms (BLAS), Linear Algebra Package (LAPACK), ScaLAPACK, Parallel Virtual Machine (PVM), Message Passing Interface (MPI), NetSolve, TOP500, Automatically Tuned Linear Algebra Software (ATLAS), High-Performance Conjugate Gradient (HPCG) and Performance Application Programming Interface (PAPI). These libraries excel in the accuracy of the underlying numerical algorithms and the reliability and performance of the software. They benefit a very wide range of users through their incorporation into software including MATLAB, Maple, Wolfram Mathematica, GNU Octave, the R programming language, SciPy, and others.

With Eric Grosse, Dongarra pioneered the distribution via email and the web of numeric open-source code collected in Netlib. He has published approximately 300 articles, papers, reports, and technical memoranda, and he is the co-author of several books. He holds an appointment with the University of Manchester, where he has served as a Turing Fellow since 2007.

=== Awards and honors ===
In 2004, Dongarra was awarded the IEEE Sid Fernbach Award for his contributions in the application of high-performance computers using innovative approaches. In 2008, he was the recipient of the first IEEE Medal of Excellence in Scalable Computing. In 2010, Dongarra was the first recipient of the SIAM Activity Group on Supercomputing Career Prize. In 2011, he was the recipient of the IEEE Computer Society Charles Babbage Award. In 2013, he was the recipient of the ACM/IEEE Ken Kennedy Award for his leadership in designing and promoting standards for mathematical software used to solve numerical problems common to high-performance computing. In 2019, Dongarra received the SIAM/ACM Prize in Computational Science. In 2020, he received the IEEE Computer Pioneer Award for leadership in the area of high-performance mathematical software.

Dongarra was elected a Fellow of the American Association for the Advancement of Science (AAAS), the Association for Computing Machinery (ACM), the Society for Industrial and Applied Mathematics (SIAM), and the Institute of Electrical and Electronics Engineers (IEEE) and a foreign member of the Russian Academy of Sciences and a foreign member of the Royal Society (ForMemRS). In 2001, he was elected a member of the US National Academy of Engineering for contributions to numerical software, parallel and distributed computation, and problem-solving environments. In 2023, Dongarra was elected to the U.S. National Academy of Sciences in recognition of his distinguished and continuing achievements in original research in the field of high-performance computing. In 2024, Dongarra received an Honorary Doctorate degree from the Department of Informatics, Ionian University.

Dongarra received the 2021 Turing Award "for pioneering contributions to numerical algorithms and libraries that enabled high performance computational software to keep pace with exponential hardware improvements for over four decades.". His algorithms and software are regarded to have fueled the growth of high-performance computing and had significant impacts in many areas of computational science, from artificial intelligence to computer graphics.
