= LINPACK =

Mathematical software

- Original authors: Jack Dongarra, Jim Bunch, Cleve Moler, and Gilbert Stewart
- Written in: Fortran
- Type: Library
- Website: netlib.org/linpack/

LINPACK is a software library for performing numerical linear algebra on digital computers. It was written in Fortran by Jack Dongarra, Jim Bunch, Cleve Moler, and Gilbert Stewart, and was intended for use on supercomputers in the 1970s and early 1980s. It has been largely superseded by LAPACK, which runs more efficiently on modern architectures.

LINPACK makes use of the BLAS (Basic Linear Algebra Subprograms) libraries for performing basic vector and matrix operations.

The LINPACK benchmarks appeared initially as part of the LINPACK user's manual. The parallel LINPACK benchmark implementation called HPL (High Performance Linpack) is used to benchmark and rank supercomputers for the TOP500 list.

== World's most powerful computer by year ==
Year(s)	Benchmark	Computer	Design					Casing			System							Successor
Year(s)	Benchmark	Computer	Manufacturer	Designer	Release date	Units sold	Price	Dimensions	Weight	Power	Front-end	Operating system	CPU	Memory	Storage	MIPS	FLOPS	Successor
1951-1954	—	MIT Whirlwind I	MIT	—	1954	1	—	—	—	—	—	—	—	—	—	—	—	—
1955-1957	—	IBM NORC	IBM	—	1954	1	—	—	—	—	—	—	—	—	—	—	—	—
1958-1959	—	AN/FSQ-7	IBM	—	1955	24	—	—	250 tons	up to 3 megawatts	—	—	49,000 vacuum tubes @ 75,000 instructions per second	—	—	—	—	—
1960	—	IBM 7090	IBM	—	—	—	—	—	—	—	—	—	—	—	—	—	—	—
1960–1961	—	UNIVAC LARC	—	—	—	—	—	—	—	—	—	—	—	—	—	—	—	—
1961–1963	—	IBM 7030 Stretch	IBM	Gene Amdahl	May 1961	9	US$7,780,000 (equivalent to $70,550,000 in 2021)	—	70,000 pounds (35 short tons; 32 t)	100 kW @ 110 V	—	MCP	64-bit processor	2048 kilobytes (262,144 x 64 bits)	—	1.2 MIPS	—	CDC 6600
1964–1968	3 megaflops	CDC 6600	Control Data Corporation	Seymour Cray	September 1964	100+	US$2,370,000 (equivalent to $20,710,000 in 2021)	Height : 2,000 mm (79 in); Cabinet width: 810 mm (32 in); Cabinet length : 1,710 mm (67 in); Width overall : 4,190 mm (165 in)	about 12,000 lb (6.0 short tons; 5.4 t)	30 kW @ 208 V 400 Hz	—	SCOPE, KRONOS	60-bit processor @ 10 MHz	Up to 982 kilobytes (131000 x 60 bits)	—	2 MIPS	—	CDC 7600
1969–1975	10 megaflops	CDC 7600	Control Data Corporation	Seymour Cray	June 1967	75+	US$62 - $155 thousands (monthly rent in 1968)	Height : 188 cm (74 in); Width: 302 cm (119 in)	—	95 kW @ 208 V 400 Hz	—	Chippewa, SCOPE, KRONOS	60-bit processor @ 36 MHz	3.84 Megabytes (up to 512000 60-bit words)	—	15 MIPS	36 MFLOPS	CDC Cyber
1976-1982	136 megaflops	Cray-1	Cray Research	Seymour Cray	1975	100+	US$7.9 million in 1977 (equivalent to $35.3 million in 2021)	Height: 196 cm (77 in); Dia. (base): 263 cm (104 in); Dia. (columns): 145 cm (57 in)	5.5 tons (Cray-1A)	115 kW @ 208 V 400 Hz	Data General Eclipse	COS, UNICOS	64-bit processor @ 80 MHz	8.39 Megabytes (up to 1 048 576 words)	303 Megabytes (DD19 Unit)	—	160 MFLOPS	Cray X-MP
1983–1985	713 megaflops	Cray X-MP/4	Cray Research	Steve Chen	1982	—	US$15 million	2.62 m (8.6 ft) x 1.96 m (6.4 ft)	5.12 t (11,300 lb)	345 kW	Most minicomputers of the time	COS, UNICOS	4x Vector processor 64 bits @ 105 - 117 MHz	128 megabytes	38.4 gigabytes (32 disks)	400 MIPS (4 CPU)	800 MFLOPS (4 CPU)	Cray-2
1985–1987	1.95 gigaflops (peak)	Cray-2	Cray Research	—	1985	25	—	—	—	—	—	—	Custom Vector Processors	—	—	—	—	Cray Y-MP
1988–1989	2.144 gigaflops	Cray Y-MP/832	Cray Research	—	—	—	—	—	—	—	—	—	—	—	—	—	—	—
1990–1991	4.0 gigaflops (measured)	Fujitsu VP2000	Fujitsu	—	—	—	—	—	—	—	—	—	—	—	—	—	—	—
1992	20.0 gigaflops	NEC SX-3/44	NEC	—	—	—	—	—	—	—	—	—	—	—	—	—	—	—
June 1993	59.7 gigaflops	Thinking Machines CM-5/1024	Thinking Machines Corporation (TMC)	Danny Hillis	—	—	—	—	—	—	—	—	—	—	—	—	—	—

== See also ==
- List of open-source mathematical libraries
