= Minisupercomputer =

Short-lived class of computers

Minisupercomputers constituted a short-lived class of computers that emerged in the mid-1980s, characterized by the combination of vector processing and small-scale multiprocessing. As scientific computing using vector processors became more popular, the need for lower-cost systems that might be used at the departmental level instead of the corporate level created an opportunity for new computer vendors to enter the market. As a generalization, the price targets for these smaller computers were one-tenth of the larger supercomputers.

Several notable technical, economic, and political attributes characterize minisupercomputers. First, they were architecturally more diverse than prior mainframes and minicomputers in hardware and less diverse in software. Second, advances in VLSI made them less expensive (mini-price). These machines were market targeted to be cost-effective and quickly manufactured. Third, it is notable who did not manufacture minisupercomputers: within the USA, IBM and the traditional mainframe makers, outside the USA: the Japanese supercomputer vendors and Russia (despite attempts to manufacture minicomputers).

The superminicomputer sector underwent a wave of consolidation in 1988 amidst intensifying price competition, increased losses, and the prospect of bankruptcy leading to several of the vendors with weaker finances seeking buyers, leading to Floating Point Systems acquiring the assets of Celerity Computing. The appearance of even lower-priced scientific workstations (e.g., Dana Computer/Ardent Computer/Stellar Computer (the merger of these companies)) based on microprocessors with high performance floating point units (FPUs) during the 1990s (such as the MIPS R8000, IBM POWER2), and Weitek eroded the demand for this class of computer.

The industry magazine Datamation coined the term "Crayette" which in short order meant instruction set compatible to Cray Research, Inc.

== Notable minisupercomputer companies ==
This list is sorted alphabetically, and many entries here are to companies that no longer exist.

- Ametek
- Alliant Computer Systems (founded 1982 as Dataflow Systems; went bankrupt in 1992)
- American Supercomputer (founded by Mike Flynn, failed 2nd round funding)
- Astronautics (Division founded by Jim Smith, U. Wisc)
- BBN Technologies (Acquired by Raytheon in 2009)
- Convex Computer (founded 1982 as Parsec; acquired by Hewlett-Packard in 1995)
- Culler Harris (CHI)
- Culler Scientific
- Cydrome (founded 1984, closed in 1988)
- DEC (VAX 9000) (Acquired by Compaq in 1998, who was acquired by HP in 2002)
- Elxsi Corporation (founded 1979) (Acquired by Tata)
- Encore Computer (founded 1983; acquired in 2002 by Compro Computer Services)
- Evans & Sutherland
- Flexible Computer
- Floating Point Systems (founded 1970; acquired by Cray Research in 1991)
- Guiltech/SAXPY
- HAL Computer Systems (Closed in 2001)
- ICL (DAP) (Acquired by Fujitsu in 2002)
- Kendall Square Research (Closed in 1994)
- Key Laboratories
- MasPar (Ceased operations in 1996)
- Meiko Scientific (Ceased operations in 1991)
- Myrias Research Corporation (Canadian firm, Edmonton, AB)
- Multiflow Computer (founded 1984; ceased operation in 1990)
- nCUBE (Acquired by C-COR in 2005)
- Prisma
- Parsytec
- Pyramid Technology (Acquired by Siemens in 1995)
- Scientific Computer Systems (founded 1983; switched to high-speed network development in 1989; now defunct)
- Sequent (Acquired by IBM in 1999)
- Solbourne (Acquired by Deloitte in 2008)
- SUPRENUM (Started as research in 1985, cancelled in 1990)
- Supertek Computers (Founded 1985; acquired by Cray Research in 1990)
- Thinking Machines Corporation (Acquired by SUN in 1994)
- Vitesse Corporation (Closed the computer division in 1987)
