= Goodyear MPP =

Massively parallel processing computer

Goodyear Massively Parallel Processor (MPP)
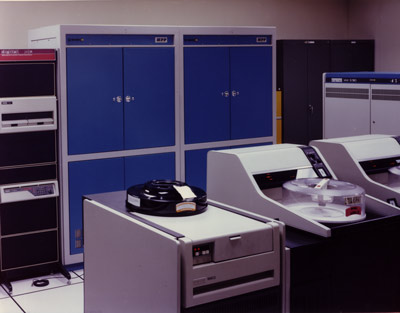
- The MPP
- Manufacturer: Goodyear Aerospace
- Introduced: 1983
- Discontinued: 1991
- Type: Supercomputer
- Processor: 16,384 processing elements (PEs)
- Memory: 32 MB Staging Memory

The Goodyear Massively Parallel Processor (MPP) was a massively parallel processing supercomputer built by Goodyear Aerospace for the NASA Goddard Space Flight Center. It was designed to deliver enormous computational power at lower cost than other existing supercomputer architectures, by using thousands of simple processing elements, rather than one or a few highly complex CPUs. Development of the MPP began circa 1979; it was delivered in May 1983, and was in general use from 1985 until 1991.

It was based on Goodyear's earlier STARAN array processor, a 4x256 1-bit processing element (PE) computer. The MPP was a 128x128 2-dimensional array of 1-bit wide PEs. In actuality 132x128 PEs were configured with a 4x128 configuration added for fault tolerance to substitute for up to 4 rows (or columns) of processors in the presence of problems. The PEs operated in a single instruction, multiple data (SIMD) fashion—each PE performed the same operation simultaneously, on different data elements, under the control of a microprogrammed control unit.

After the MPP was retired in 1991, it was donated to the Smithsonian Institution, and is now in the collection of the National Air and Space Museum's Steven F. Udvar-Hazy Center. It was succeeded at Goddard by the MasPar MP-1 and Cray T3D massively parallel computers.

== Applications ==
The MPP was initially developed for high-speed analysis of satellite images. In early tests, it was able to extract and separate different land-use areas on Landsat imagery in 18 seconds, as compared with 7 hours on a DEC VAX-11/780.

Once the system was put into production use, NASA's Office of Space Science and Applications solicited proposals from scientists across the country to test and implement a wide range of computational algorithms on the MPP. 40 projects were accepted, to form the "MPP Working Group"; results of most of them were presented at the First Symposium on the Frontiers of Massively Parallel Computation, in 1986.

Some examples of applications that were made of the MPP are:

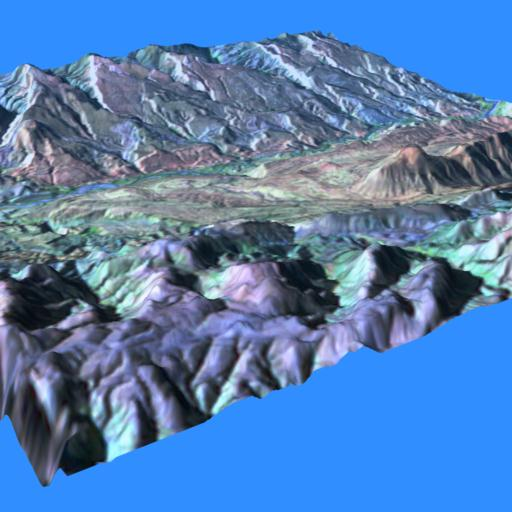
Topographic map generated by stereo analysis

- Signal processing of synthetic-aperture radar data
- Generating topographic maps via stereo analysis of satellite images
- Mathematical modeling of ocean circulation
- Ray traced computer graphics
- Neural networks
- Solving large systems of linear equations
- Simulation of cosmic ray charged particle transport
- High resolution Mandelbrot sets

== System architecture ==
The overall MPP hardware consisted of the Array Unit, Array Control Unit, Staging Memory, and Host Processor.

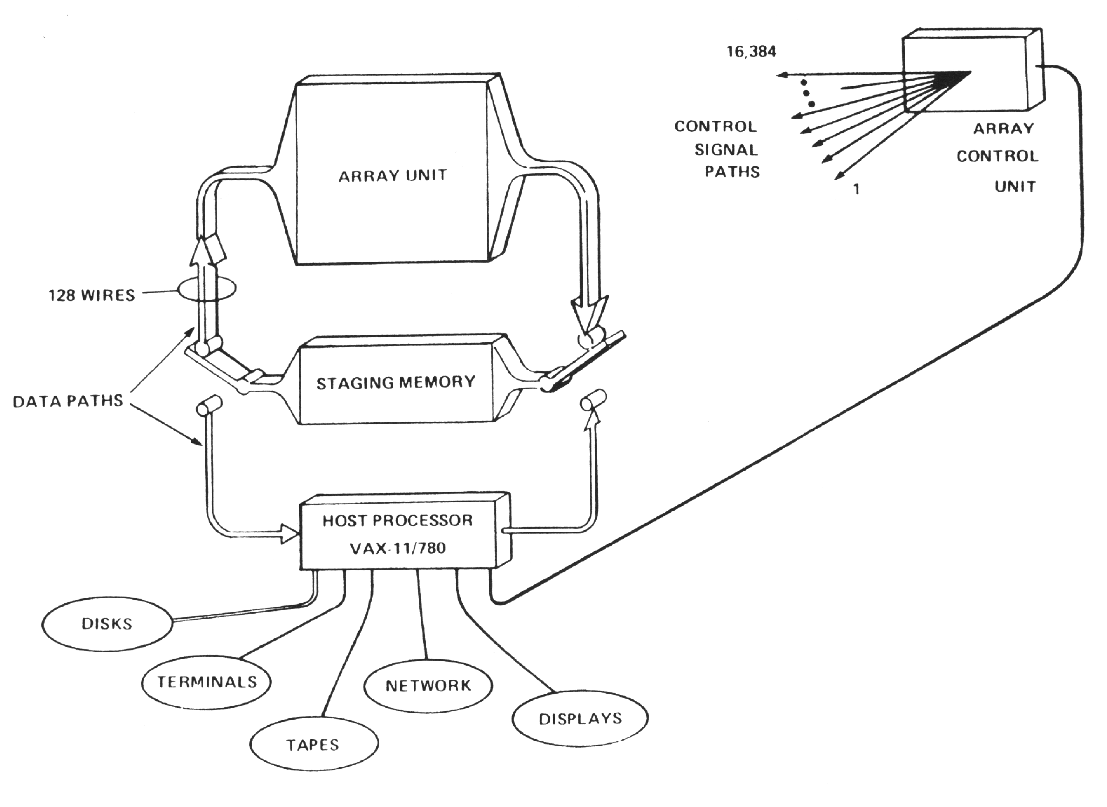
MPP system diagram

The Array Unit was the heart of the MPP, being the 128x128 array of 16,384 processing elements. Each PE was connected to its four nearest neighbors - north, south, east, and west. The array could be configured as a plane, a cylinder, a daisy-chain or as a torus. The PEs were implemented on a custom silicon-on-sapphire LSI chip which contained eight of the PEs as a 2x4 subarray. Each of the PEs had arithmetic and logic units, 35 shift registers, and 1024 bits of random-access memory implemented with off-the-shelf memory chips. The processors worked in a bit-slice manner and could operate on variable lengths of data. The operating frequency of the array was 10 MHz. Data-bus states of all 16,384 PEs were combined in a tree of inclusive-or logic elements whose single output was used in the Array Control Unit for operations such as finding the maximum or minimum value of an array in parallel. A register in each PE controlled masking of operations — masked operations were only performed on those PEs where this register bit was set.

The Array Control Unit (ACU) broadcast commands and memory addresses to all PEs in the Array Unit, and received status bits from the Array Unit. It performed bookkeeping operations such as loop control and subroutine calling. Application program code was stored in the ACU's memory; the ACU executed scalar parts of the program, and then queued up parallel instructions for the array. It also controlled the shifting of data among PEs, and between the Array Unit and the Staging Memory.

The Staging Memory was a 32 MB block of memory for buffering Array Unit data. It was useful because the PEs themselves had only a total of 2 MB of memory (1024 bits per PE), and because it provided higher communication bit rate than the Host Processor connection (80 megabytes/second versus 5 megabytes/second). The Staging Memory also provided data-manipulation features such as "corner turning" (rearranging byte- or word-oriented data from the array) and multi-dimensional array access. Data was moved between the Staging Memory and the array via 128 parallel lines.

The Host Processor was a front-end computer that loaded programs and data into the MPP, and provided software development tools and networked access to the MPP. The original Host Processor was a PDP-11, which was soon replaced by a VAX-11/780 connected to the MPP by a DR-780 channel. The VAX ran the VMS operating system, and was programmed in MPP Pascal.

== Speed of operations ==
The raw computing speed for basic arithmetic operations on the MPP was as follows:

Operation	Millions of operations per second
Addition of arrays
8-bit integers (9-bit sum)	6553
12-bit integers (13-bit sum)	4428
32-bit floating point numbers	430
Multiplication of arrays
8-bit integers (16-bit product)	1861
12-bit integers (24-bit product)	910
32-bit floating point numbers	216
Multiplication of array by scalar
8-bit integers (16-bit product)	2340
12-bit integers (24-bit product)	1260
32-bit floating point numbers	373

== See also ==
- ICL DAP
- Thinking Machines Connection Machine
- MasPar
- Beowulf cluster
- Parsytec
- SUPRENUM
