= Quadrics (company) =

Supercomputer company

Quadrics Ltd.
- Type: Private Subsidiary
- Industry: HPC Interconnects
- Founded: 1996
- Defunct: 2009
- Headquarters: Bristol, UK
- Products: QsNet, RMS, 10GigE switches
- Services: Linux clustering
- Parent: Alenia, part of Finmeccanica

Quadrics was a supercomputer company formed in 1996 as a joint venture between Alenia Spazio and the technical team from Meiko Scientific. They produced hardware and software for clustering commodity computer systems into massively parallel systems. Their highpoint was in June 2003 when six out of the ten fastest supercomputers in the world were based on Quadrics' interconnect. They officially closed on June 29, 2009.

== Company history ==
The Quadrics name was first used in 1993 for a commercialized version of the APE100 SIMD parallel computer produced by Alenia Spazio and originally developed by INFN, the Italian National Institute of Nuclear Physics. In 1996, a new Alenia subsidiary, Quadrics Supercomputers World (QSW) was formed, based in Bristol, UK and Rome, Italy, inheriting the Quadrics SIMD product line and the Meiko CS-2 massively parallel supercomputer architecture. In 2002 the company name was shortened to be simply Quadrics.

Initially, the new company focussed on the development potential of the CS-2's processor interconnect technology. Their first design was the Elan2 network ASIC, intended for use with the UltraSPARC CPU, attached to it using the Ultra Port Architecture (UPA) system bus. Plans to introduce the Elan2 were later dropped, and a new Elan3 hosted on PCI introduced instead. By the time of its release Elan3 had been re-aimed at the Alpha/PCI market instead, after Quadrics had formed a relationship with Digital Equipment Corporation (DEC).

The combination of Quadrics and Alpha 21264 (EV6) microprocessors proved very successful, and Digital/Compaq rapidly became one of the world's largest suppliers of supercomputers. This culminated with the building the largest machine in the US, the 20 TFLOP ASCI Q, installed at Los Alamos National Laboratory during 2002 and 2003. The machine consisted of 2,048 AlphaServer SC nodes (which are based on AlphaServer ES45), each with four 1.25 GHz Alpha 21264A (EV67) microprocessors and two rails of the Quadrics QsNet network. Unfortunately this system failed in reliability and was never put into production use.

Quadrics also had success in selling Linux based systems. Quadrics' first Linux based system was installed in June/July 2001 at SHARCNET. It was the fastest civilian system in Canada at the time of installation. Another high-profile Quadrics system was the fastest Linux cluster in the world called Thunder installed at Lawrence Livermore National Laboratory in 2003/2004. Thunder consisted of 1024 Intel Tiger Quad Itanium II Processor servers to deliver 19.94 teraflops on parallel Linpack. Peak performance of the system was 22.9 teraflops, at a level of efficiency of 87%.

In 2004, Quadrics was selected by Bull for what was the fastest supercomputer in Europe: TERA-10 at the French CEA: 544 Bull NovaScale 6160 computing nodes, each including eight Itanium 2 processors. The global configuration will feature 8,704 processors with 27 terabytes of core memory. Each of these computing nodes will contain multiple Quadrics QsNetII (Elan4) network adapters to deliver over 60 teraflops (sixty thousands billions of operations per second).

Quadrics was selected by HP for the upgrade of SHARCNET, the Canadian Cluster of Clusters, with four new high-performance computing clusters that would increase the network's capacity from 1,000 to 6,000 processors. QsNetII was used for one capacity and one capability cluster.

In August 2005 Quadrics and STMicroelectronics signed a development agreement. The cooperation was to cover the design of a future generations of Quadrics high speed multi gigabit interconnect, and the exploitation of the products in a range of high volume applications. This co-operation never bore fruit despite the secondment of STMicroelectronics Bristol based staff to Quadrics.

The decision to close the company was made in April 2009, despite the next-generation QsNet^{III} product being very close to completion. Support for older products and the IP rights were transferred to Vega UK Ltd (now Telespazio VEGA ), and the Quadrics offices were closed on June 29, 2009. Many of Quadrics' technical staff have since found similar employment in developing HPC networking products with Gnodal, one of the many fabless semiconductor companies based in Bristol in the UK.

== Quadrics products ==
=== Hardware ===
- Quadrics QsNet^{I} - HPC interconnect based on the elan3/elite3 ASICs (350 MB/s @ 5 us MPI latency)
- Quadrics QsNet^{II} - HPC interconnect based on the elan4/elite4 ASICs (912 MB/s on SR1400 EM64T and 1.26 us MPI latency on HP DL145G2)
- QsTenG - 10 Gigabit Ethernet switches, from 24-port (1U) to very large switches.
- QsNet III - HPC interconnect based on the elan5/elite5 ASICs (approximately 2 GB/s each direction and 1.3 us MPI latency). This is the first product from Quadrics that is compatible with a standard - in this case 10 Gbit Ethernet.

==== QsNet ====
QsNet was a high speed interconnect designed by Quadrics used in high-performance computing computer clusters, particularly Linux Beowulf clusters. Although it can be used with TCP/IP; like SCI, Myrinet and InfiniBand it is usually used with a communication API such as Message Passing Interface (MPI) or SHMEM called from a parallel program.

The interconnect consists of a PCI card in each compute node and one or more dedicated switch chassis. These are connected with a copper cables. Within the switch chassis are a number of line cards that carry Elite switch ASICs. These are internally linked to form a fat tree topology. Like other interconnects such as Myrinet very large systems can be built by using multiple switch chassis arranged as spine (top-level) and leaf (node-level) switches. Such systems were called "federated networks".

It was announced in 1998 and used PCI 66-64 cards that had 'elan3' Custom ASIC on them. These gave an MPI bandwidth of around 350 MB/s unidirectional with 5 us latency.

==== QsNet II ====
QsNet II was the fourth and penultimate generation of Quadrics interconnect family products, and was launched in 2003. QsNetII interfaced to the host computer through the standard IO PCI-X bus. Later versions of the card had PCIe physical interfaces although this was bridged on the card to PCI-X with a performance penalty. A native PCIe version was never developed. Instead resource was focused on QsNetII's successor QsNetIII which although completed was never released commercially.

The architecture of the network interface has been developed to offload the entire task of interprocessor communication from the main processor, and to avoid the overhead of system calls for user process to user process messaging. QsNetII is designed for use within SMP systems — multiple, concurrent processes can utilise the network interface without any task switching overhead. A I/O processor offloads protocol handling from the main CPU. Local memory on the PCI card provides storage for buffers, translation tables and I/O adapter code. All the PCI bandwidth is available to data communication.

QsNetII's core design is based on two ASICs: Elan4 and Elite4. Elan4 is a communication processor that forms the interface between a high-performance multistage network and a processing node with one or more CPUs. Elite4 is a switching component that can switch eight bidirectional communications links, each of which carrying data in both directions simultaneously at 1.3 GB/s.

Quadrics QsNetII interconnect like its predecessor QsNet uses a 'fat tree' topology, QsNetII scales up to 4096 nodes, each node might have multiple CPUs so that systems of >10,000 CPUs can be constructed. Multiple, parallel QsNet networks can be employed in a system to maintain the compute to communications ratio where high CPU count SMP nodes are employed. The fat tree topology is resilient with large amounts of redundancy in the higher levels of the switch.

Performance depends on platform used and configuration of the system, QsNetII MPI latency on standard AMD Opteron starts at 1.22 μs; Bandwidth on Intel Xeon Intel 64 is 912 MB/s.

In 2004, Quadrics started releasing small to medium switch stand-alone switch configurations called QsNetII E-Series, these configurations range from the 8 to the 128-way systems.

==== QsTenG ====
In November 2005, Quadrics announced a new product based on 10 Gigabit Ethernet (10 GigE), called QsTenG. The first QsTenG switch was an 8U chassis with 12 slots for 10 GigE line cards, making 96 ports in total. Each line card had eight 10 GigE ports that connect using 10GBASE-CX4 connectors. Each line card also had four internal ports that connected the line cards together into a fat tree configuration. Since then, Quadrics brought out a second generation of 10 GigE switches, starting with a compact 1U switch with 24 ports, which comes in two variants, TG201-CA, 24 ports CX4, and TG201-XA, 24 ports in total, 12 XSP and 12 CX4. They were expected to bring out a range of larger switches in 2009, the chassis was planned to be the same as the QsNetIII, the switch to have been called TG215.

Late in 2007, the Quadrics management decided to cancel the QsTenG Ethernet developments and concentrate efforts on the QsNet product line. This caused a group employees to leave and help found Gnodal, to develop large scalable Ethernet systems.

=== Software ===
Software included a cluster resource manager software package called QuadricsRms, and Quadrics Linux Software, core components of the QsNet software release for Linux under the GNU LGPL License

== See also ==
- NUMAlink
- HIPPI
- InfiniBand
- Myrinet
- Scalable Coherent Interconnect (SCI)
- Gigabit Ethernet
