= SHARCNET =

Canadian consortium of universities

Shared Hierarchical Academic Research Computing Network

SHARCNET is a consortium of universities in Ontario, Canada, that aggregate funding to purchase supercomputer systems, which are shared among the members to perform research, rather than individually purchasing smaller systems at each university. It was formed to allow members access to larger, faster, and more modern computer resources than they would otherwise be able to afford, and to retain researchers at their organizations. SHARCNET is part of the larger Compute Canada umbrella. As of June 2017, the fastest computer at SHARCNET according to the Top 500 list is Graham, which entered the list as the 95th fastest computer in the world with a High Performance Linpack result of 1,228 TeraFLOPS.

== History ==
SHARCNET was originally founded in June, 2001 with seven institutions: McMaster University, the University of Western Ontario, University of Guelph, University of Windsor, Wilfrid Laurier University, Fanshawe College, and Sheridan College. Initial seed funding of C$42.1 million came from government, academic, and industry partners. The universities contributed a total of C$8.5 million, the Ontario Research and Development Challenge Fund contributed C$8.4 million, Canada Foundation for Innovation and Ontario Innovation Trust each contributed C$6.6 million, Compaq Canada contributed C$7 million, while Quadrics Supercomputing World, Platform Computing, Nortel and Bell Canada contributed a total of C$4 million.

SHARCNET was expanded in June 2003 to include the University of Waterloo, Brock University, York University, and the University of Ontario Institute of Technology. In December 2005, the partnership grew again with the addition of Trent University, Laurentian University, and Lakehead University. In March 2006, Perimeter Institute for Theoretical Physics and the Ontario College of Art & Design were added to the consortium. Nipissing University and Conestoga College joined in 2008 and 2014 respectively, for a total of 18 academic partners (14 universities, 3 colleges, and a research institute).

The first system from SHARCNET reported on the Top 500 November, 2001 list was GreatWhite, which was installed at the University of Western Ontario, and entered the list at the #183 spot with an Rmax of 185.3 GigaFLOPS. This system was notable because it was the fastest civilian system in Canada at the time of installation, and was the first running the Quadrics Elan network on Linux.
