= Gnodal =

English computer networking company

- Company type: Private
- Industry: Networking hardware
- Founded: March 2007
- Defunct: October 2013
- Fate: Entered administration; some staff and IP bought by Cray
- Headquarters: Bristol, UK
- Key people: Eddie Minshull, Executive Chairman, Fred Homewood, CTO, Tony Ford, COO, Mike Cartwright, CFO
- Products: Switches
- Number of employees: 51 (Peak)
- Website: www.gnodal.com

Gnodal was a computer networking company headquartered in Bristol, UK. The company designed and sold network switches for datacenter, high-performance computing and high-frequency trading environments. Gnodal's products were based on its own Peta ASIC, which was the basis of a family of 1RU and 2RU 10 Gigabit Ethernet low latency switches, including the GS7200 switch. Gnodal's products ran a Linux-based network operating system, GnoS OS, which was based on Aricent's ISS product.

== Corporate history ==
Gnodal was founded in March 2007 by Fred Homewood, Tony Ford, Jon Beecroft, David Hewson and Ed Turner (all formerly of Quadrics). Matt Hatch joined the founding group in July 2007. The company was funded by this group until April 2008, then receiving £1.1m seed funding from Adrian Beecroft (former CIO of Apax Partners), NESTA, South West Ventures Fund and Finance South West Growth Fund (both managed at the time by YFM). Will Leonard (formerly at Xyratex) was appointed as a non-executive director and chairman by the investors at this time.

Dawn Capital (an ECF) joined the other funds in an A round of unspecified size completed in July 2009.

On 1 September 2010, Eddie Minshull joined the company as chairman, replacing Will Leonard. At the time Minshull was also CEO of MLLTelecom and was formerly EVP of Worldwide Field Operations for Juniper Networks.

In 2011, Gnodal launched its first products at Interop in Las Vegas, May 2011. Also in 2011, Mike Cartwright joined the company as CFO.

In March 2012, Bob Fernander joined the company, replacing Fred Homewood as CEO. Fred took the role of full-time CTO after Bob's appointment.

At the Interop trade show in May 2012, Gnodal won Best of Interop, for networking with its 72 port 40GbE switch in Las Vegas. At 2RU for 72x 40GbE ports, this switch was the most dense at the time.

In March 2013, Beb Fernander left Gnodal and Eddie Minshull was appointed Executive Chairman, in a significant reorganisation that included a major reduction in staffing levels. Unconfirmed rumours indicated that Fernander had failed to close a required funding round.

A 36 port 40GbE switch, the GS0036, was introduced by Gnodal in May 2013 at Interop in Las Vegas.

On 4 October 2013 Gnodal Limited, the UK operating company, went into Administration with BDO being appointed as the Administrator.

On 1 November 2013 Cray announced the acquisition of the Gnodal intellectual property and team in Europe, with Gnodal ceasing trading as a result. All the remaining founders, Jon Beecroft, Tony Ford, David Hewson, Fred Homewood, Ed Turner and employees joined Cray on that date.

== Technology ==
=== Low Latency ASIC ===
Gnodal's technology was implemented in their own low latency ASIC and customised software stack. This used a number of techniques (patented and commercial secret) to implement a multi-path Ethernet switching system based on multiple, co-operating ASICs without loops, delivering low end-to-end latency with intra packet load balancing delivered over in-band connections.

== Products ==
=== Ethernet switches ===
Gnodal's product line could be separated into two groups:

1. Top of Rack: Included GS7200 and GS4008, allowed standard based connectivity to servers and devices via standard 10GbE SFP+ optics or 40GbE QSFP connections
2. Fabric: GS0018 full line-rate 18 port 40Gb top-of-rack fabric switch, with QSFP Links in 1RU. GS0036, full line rate 36 port 40 Gb top-of-rack fabric switch, with 36 QSFP links in 1RU. GS0072, full line rate 72 port 40 Gb top-of-rack fabric switch, with 72 QSFP links in 2RU.

== Major competitors ==
1. Brocade Communications Systems
2. Cisco Systems
3. Dell (following acquisition of Force10)
4. Extreme Networks
5. Arista Networks
6. Juniper Networks
7. Avaya
