= Inmos =

Former British company

Inmos Limited
- Type: Private
- Industry: Semiconductors
- Founded: Bristol, United Kingdom, (1978)
- Founders: Iann Barron, Richard Petritz, Paul Schroeder
- Fate: Acquired by SGS-Thomson (1989)
- Headquarters: United Kingdom
- Products: Memory, Transputer
- Parent: STMicroelectronics (United Kingdom)
- Website: www.inmos.com

Inmos International plc (trademark INMOS) and two operating subsidiaries, Inmos Limited (UK) and Inmos Corporation (US), was a British semiconductor company founded by Iann Barron, Richard Petritz, and Paul Schroeder in July 1978. Inmos Limited’s head office and design office were at Aztec West business park in Bristol, England.

== Products ==
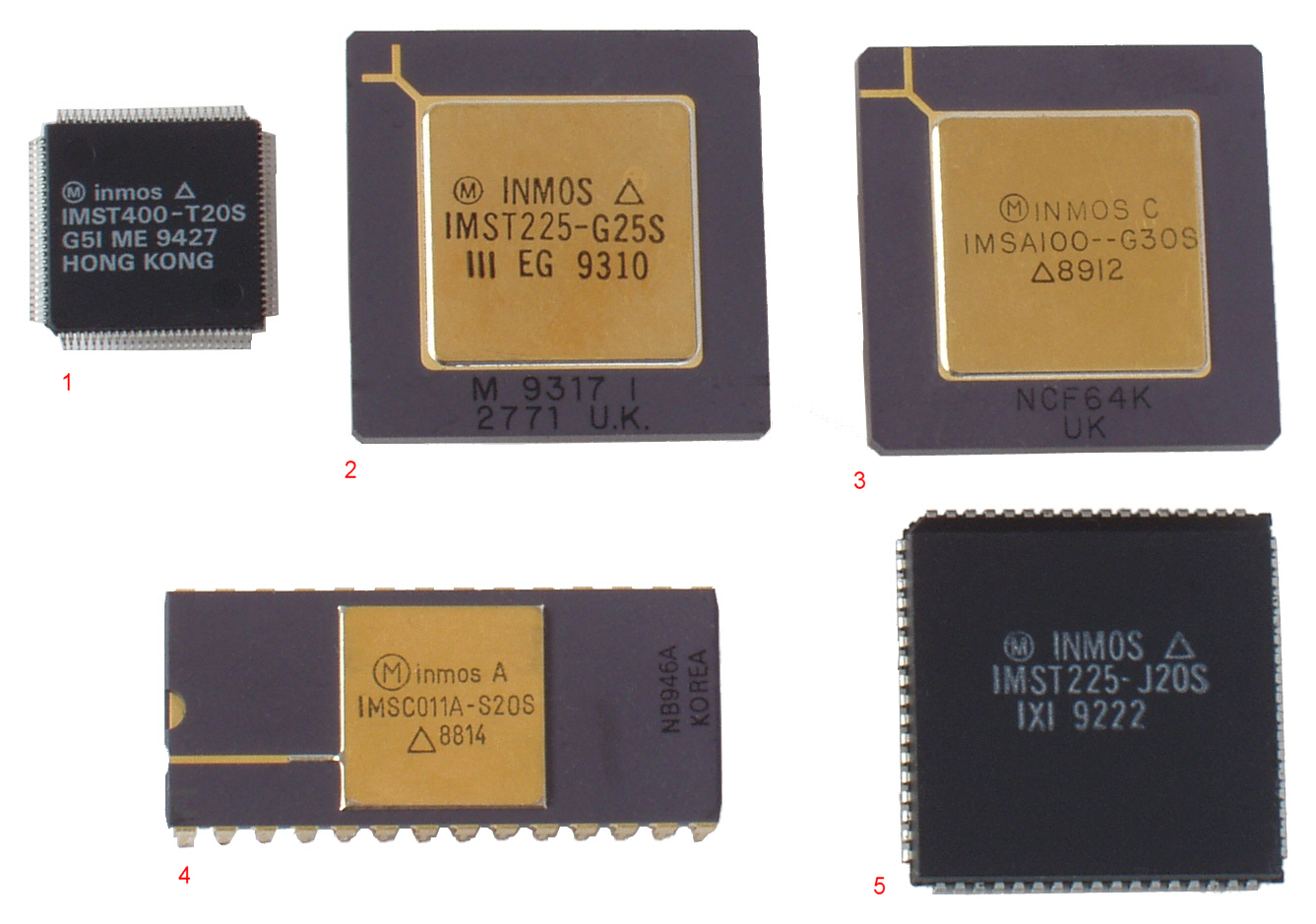
Various Inmos ICs

Inmos' first products were static RAM devices, followed by dynamic RAMs and EEPROMs. Despite early production difficulties, Inmos eventually captured around 60% of the world SRAM market. However, Barron's long-term aim was to produce an innovative microprocessor architecture intended for parallel processing, the transputer. David May and Robert Milne were recruited to design this processor, which went into production in 1985 in the form of the T212 and T414 chips.

The transputer achieved some success as the basis for several parallel supercomputers from companies such as Meiko (formed by ex-Inmos employees in 1985), Floating Point Systems, Parsytec and Parsys. It was used in a few workstations, the most notable probably being the Atari Transputer Workstation. Being a relatively self-contained design, it was also used in some embedded systems. However, the unconventional nature of the transputer and its native occam programming language limited its appeal. During the late 1980s, the transputer (even in its later T800 form) also struggled to keep up with the ever-increasing performance of its competitors.

Other devices produced by Inmos included the A100, A110 and A121 digital signal processors, G364 framebuffer, and a line of video RAMDACs, including the G170 and G171, which was adopted by IBM for the original VGA graphics adapter used in the IBM PS/2.

== Business history ==
The company was founded by Iann Barron, a British computer consultant, Richard Petritz and Paul Schroeder, both American semiconductor industry veterans. Initial funding of £50 million was provided by the UK government via the National Enterprise Board. A US subsidiary, Inmos Corporation, was also established in Colorado. Semiconductor fabrication facilities were built in the US at Colorado Springs, Colorado and in the UK at Newport, South Wales.

Under the privatization policy of Margaret Thatcher the National Enterprise Board was merged into the British Technology Group and had to sell its shares in Inmos. Offers for Inmos from AT&T and a Dutch consortium had been turned down. In 1982, construction of the microprocessor factory in Newport, South Wales was completed. By July 1984 Thorn EMI had made a £124.1m bid for the state's 76% interest in the company (the remaining 24% had been held by Inmos founders and employees). Later it was raised to £192 million, approved August 1984 and finalized in September.

In total, Inmos had received £211 million from the government, but did not become profitable. According to Iann Barron, Inmos was profitable in 1984 "we were really profitable in 1984 ... we made revenues of £150 million, and we made a profit which was slightly less than £10 million".

In April 1989, Inmos was sold to SGS-Thomson (now STMicroelectronics). Around the same time, work was started on an enhanced transputer, the T9000. This encountered various technical problems and delays, and was eventually abandoned, signalling the end of the development of the transputer as a parallel processing platform. However, transputer derivatives such as the ST20 were later incorporated into chipsets for embedded applications such as set-top boxes.

In December 1994, Inmos was fully assimilated into STMicroelectronics, and the usage of the Inmos brand name was discontinued.
