= Craig Mundie =

American Businessman, former Microsoft executive

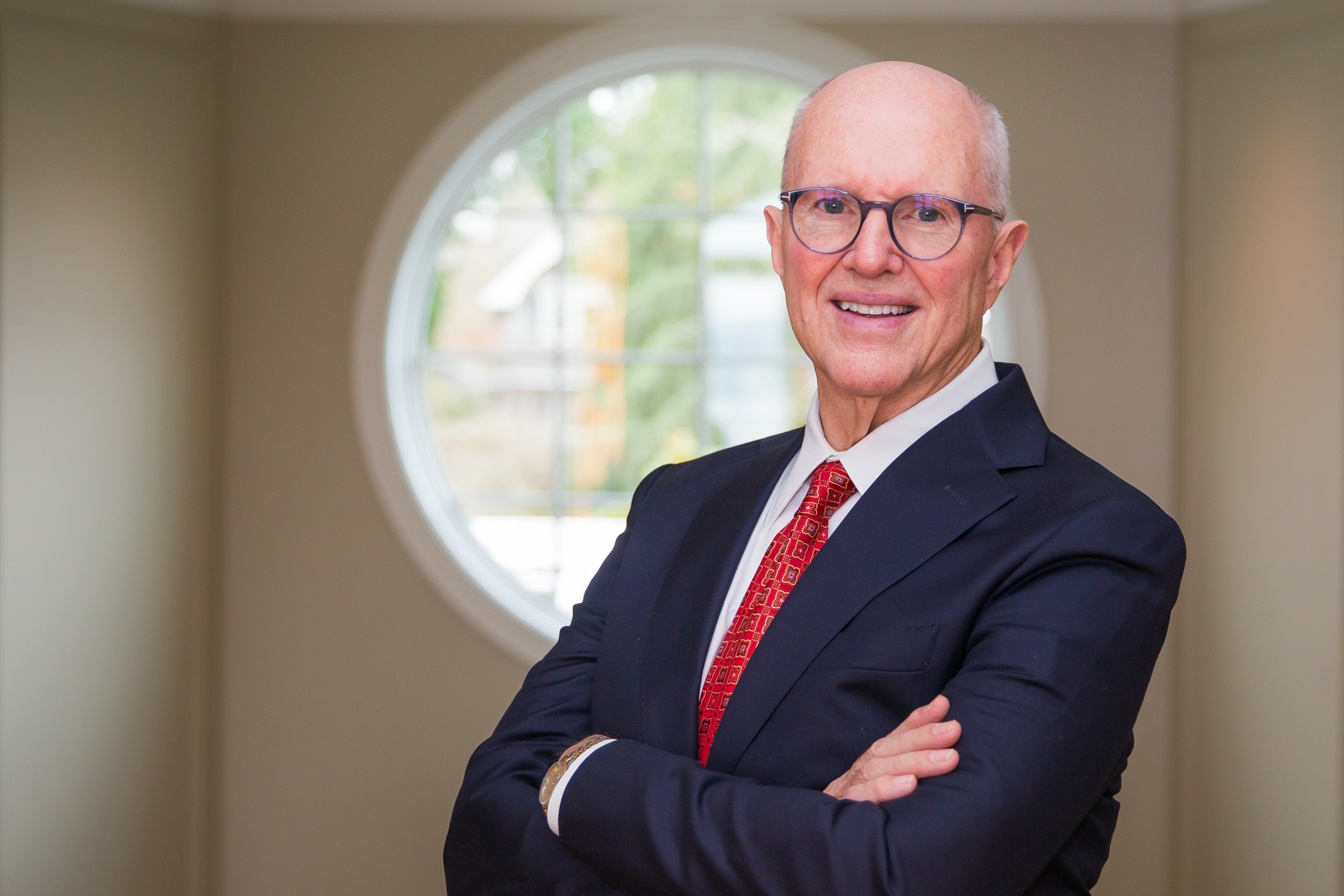
- Mundie in 2025
- Born: July 1, 1949 (age 77); Cleveland, Ohio
- Education: Georgia Institute of Technology
- Occupation: Businessman
- Website: Craig Mundie

Craig James Mundie (born July 1, 1949) is an American businessman. In 1982, he co-founded Alliant Computer Systems, becoming CEO. He was later Senior Advisor to the CEO at Microsoft, after being Microsoft's Chief Research and Strategy Officer from 2006 to 2012. He retired from Microsoft in 2014.

== Biography ==
Craig James Mundie was born on July 1, 1949 in Cleveland, Ohio. Mundie holds a bachelor's degree in Electrical Engineering (1971) and a master's degree in Information Theory and Computer Science (1972) from Georgia Tech.

In 1970, Mundie began his career as an operating system developer for the Data General Nova computer at Systems Equipment Corporation which was started by Wilton Rooks in Atlanta in 1969 to develop small business computer systems. SEC was subsequently acquired by Data General Corporation, where Mundie later became director of its advanced development facility in Research Triangle Park, North Carolina. In 1982, he co-founded Alliant Computer Systems, holding a variety of positions there before becoming CEO. Alliant filed for bankruptcy in 1992.

He started at Microsoft in the company's consumer platforms division in 1992, managing the production of Windows CE for hand-held and automotive systems and early console games. In 1997, while at Microsoft Mundie oversaw the acquisition of WebTV Networks. He has championed Microsoft Trustworthy Computing and digital rights management. Starting in 2006, when Bill Gates retired full-time from Microsoft, Mundie and Ray Ozzie split Gates' former duties at the company, with Mundie becoming Microsoft's Chief Research and Strategy Officer. In late 2012, he became Senior Advisor to the CEO, with plans to retire in 2014, at the age of 65.

Craig Mundie served as a member of the National Security Telecommunications Advisory Committee under Presidents Clinton, Bush and Obama, providing guidance on technology and national security. He also served on the President's Council of Advisors on Science and Technology (PCAST) during the Obama administration, contributing to national science and technology policy. Mundie attended all meetings of the Bilderberg Group between 2003 and 2019 (except in 2005). As of 2010 he was a member of the Steering Committee, which determines the invitation list and the agenda for the upcoming annual Bilderberg meetings.

Mundie also co-authored a book titled, Genesis, with the late Henry Kissinger, and former Google CEO Eric Schmidt, that was released on November 19, 2024.

Mundie is co-chair of a Track II dialogue with China on artificial intelligence.
