= Blinkenlights =

Hacker jargon for computerised blinking lights

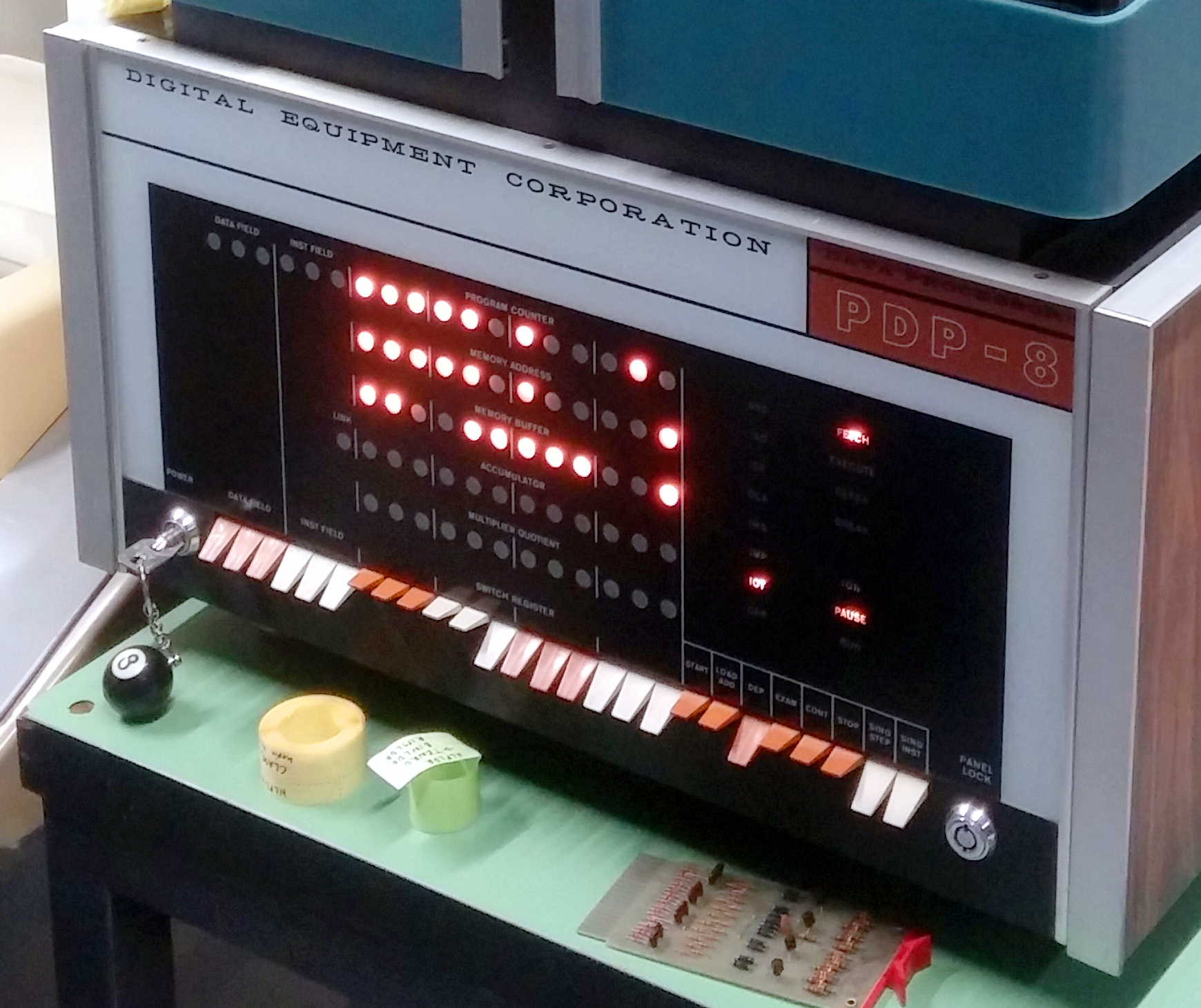
Lights on the front panel of a DEC PDP-8 (1965)

The Harwell Dekatron Computer does arithmetic at approximately human speed. Watching the lights allows one to follow the instructions and the changing data as it runs the Squares program displayed on the panels

In computer jargon, blinkenlights are diagnostic lights on front panels of old mainframe computers. More recently the term applies to status lights of modern network hardware (modems, network hubs, etc.). Blinkenlights disappeared from more recent computers for a number of reasons, the most important being the fact that with faster CPUs a human can no longer interpret the processes in the computer on the fly.

== Origins ==
The term has its origins in hacker humor and is taken from a famous (often blackletter-Gothic) mock warning sign written in a mangled form of German. Variants of the sign were relatively common in computer rooms in English-speaking countries from the early 1960s. One version read:

ACHTUNG!
ALLES TURISTEN UND NONTEKNISCHEN LOOKENSPEEPERS!
DAS KOMPUTERMASCHINE IST NICHT FÜR DER GEFINGERPOKEN UND MITTENGRABEN! ODERWISE IST EASY TO SCHNAPPEN DER SPRINGENWERK, BLOWENFUSEN UND POPPENCORKEN MIT SPITZENSPARKEN.
IST NICHT FÜR GEWERKEN BEI DUMMKOPFEN. DER RUBBERNECKEN SIGHTSEEREN KEEPEN DAS COTTONPICKEN HÄNDER IN DAS POCKETS MUSS.
ZO RELAXEN UND WATSCHEN DER BLINKENLICHTEN.

Some versions of the sign end with the word blinkenlights.

The sign dates back as far as 1955 at IBM, and a copy was reported at London University's Atlas computer facility.

Although the sign might initially appear to be in German and uses an approximation of German grammar, it is composed largely of words that are either near-homonyms of English words or (in the cases of the longer words) actual English words that are rendered in a faux-German spelling. As such, the sign is generally comprehensible by many English speakers regardless of whether they have any fluency in German, but mostly incomprehensible to German speakers with no knowledge of English. Much of the humor in these signs was their intentionally incorrect language.

Michael J. Preston relates the sign as being posted above photocopiers in offices as a warning not to mess with the machine in the first print reference from 1974. The sign is also reported to have been seen on an electron microscope at the Cavendish Laboratory in the 1950s. Such pseudo-German parodies were common in Allied machine shops during and following World War II, and an example photocopy is shown in the Jargon File.

The Jargon File also mentions that German hackers had in turn developed their own versions of the blinkenlights poster, in broken English:

ATTENTION
This room is fullfilled mit special electronische equippment.
Fingergrabbing and pressing the cnoeppkes from the computers is allowed for die experts only!
So all the "lefthanders" stay away and do not disturben the brainstorming von here working intelligencies.
Otherwise you will be out thrown and kicked anderswhere!
Also: please keep still and only watchen astaunished the blinkenlights.

== Actual blinkenlights ==
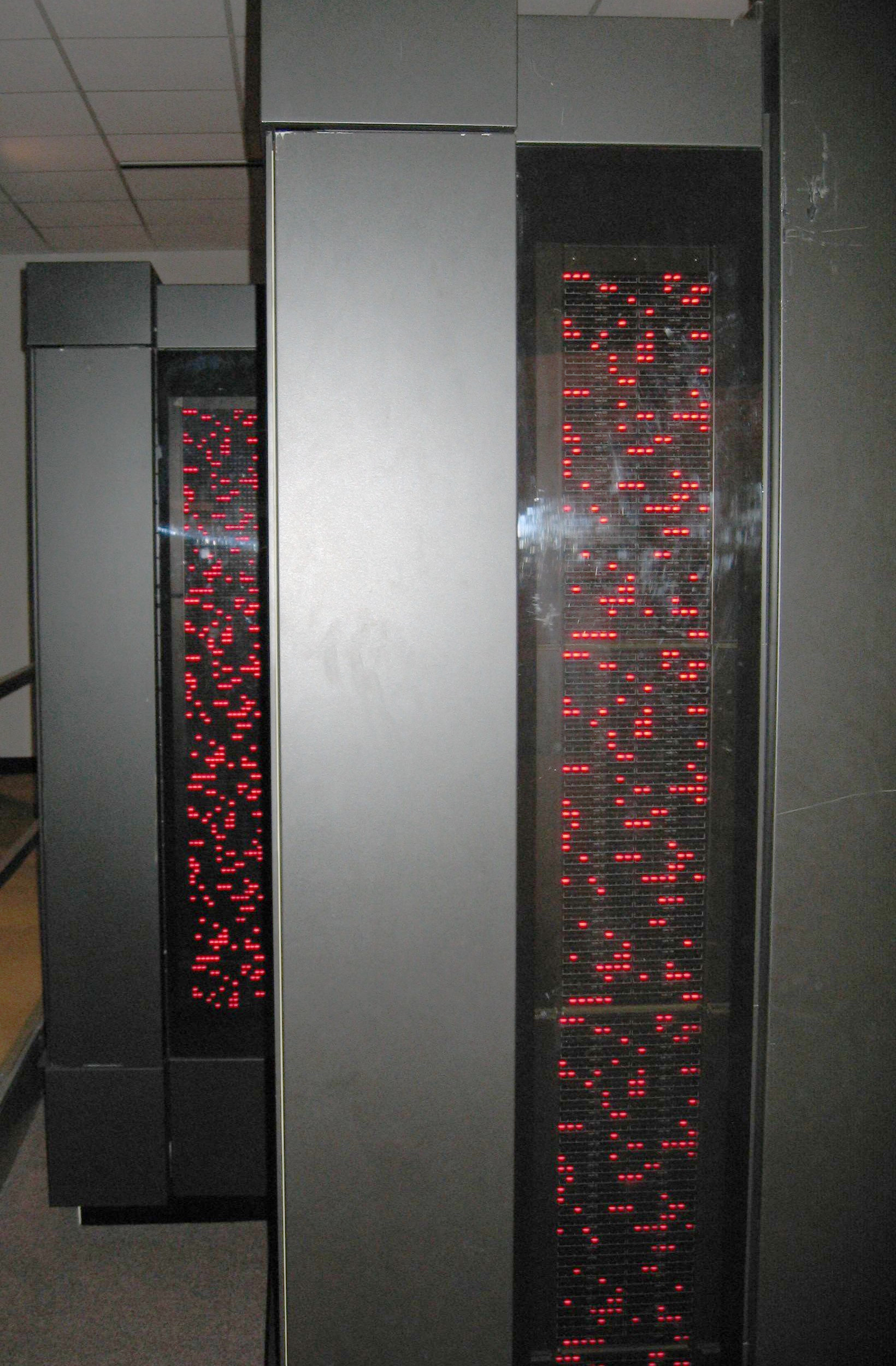
Blinkenlights on the NSA's FROSTBURG supercomputer from the 1990s

Typical LED pattern of a Thinking Machines CM-5

The Connection Machine, a 65536-processor parallel computer designed in the mid-1980s, was a black cube with one side covered with a grid of red blinkenlights; the sales demo had them evolving Conway's Game of Life patterns.

The two CPU load monitors on the front of BeBoxes were also called "blinkenlights".

This word gave its name to several projects, including the German Chaos Computer Club's Project Blinkenlights and the Blinkenlights Archaeological Institute.

== See also ==
- Faxlore
- Macaronic language
- Turbo encabulator
