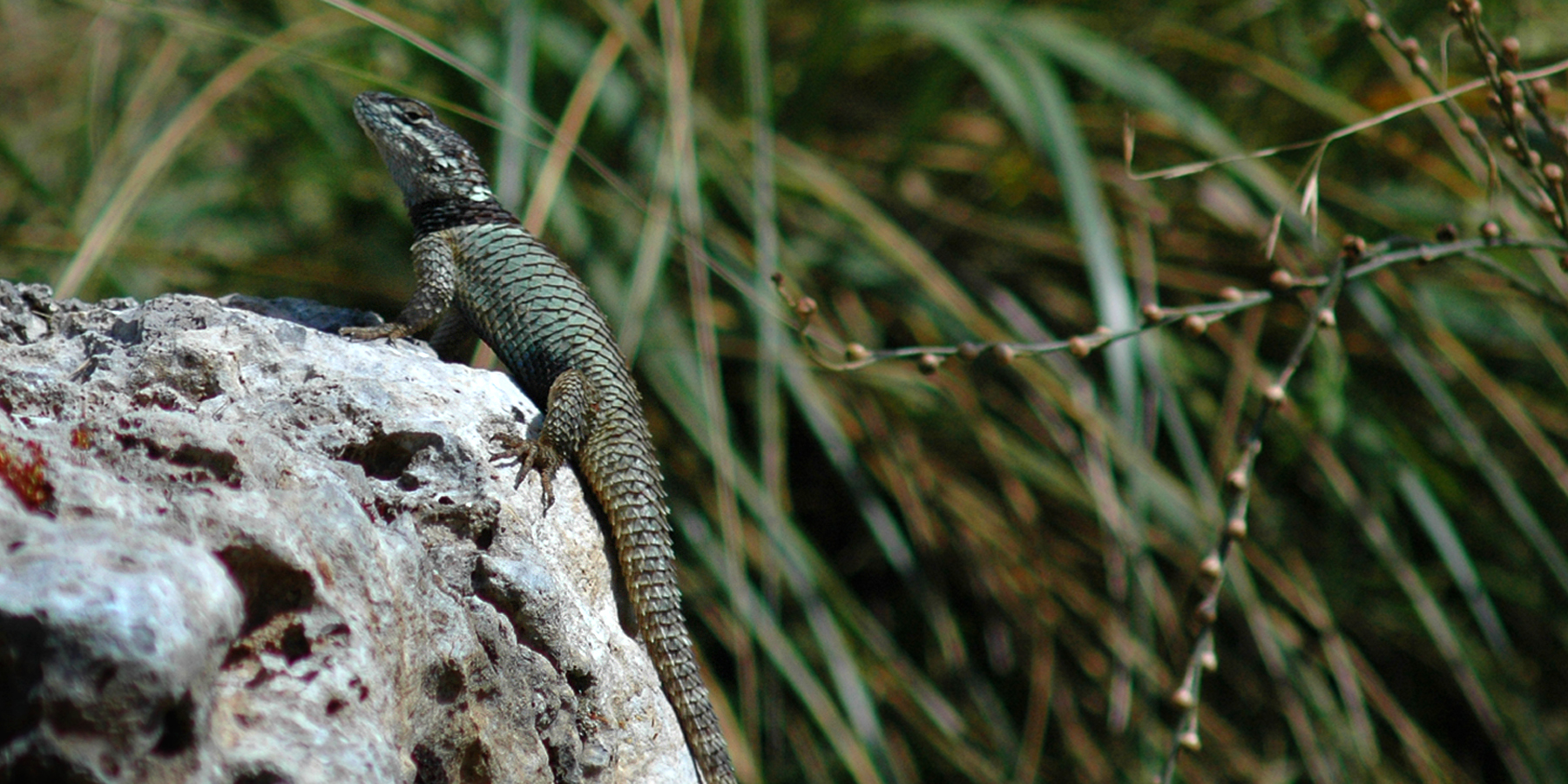

Scientific classification
- Domain: Eukaryota
- Kingdom: Animalia
- Phylum: Chordata
- Class: Reptilia
- Order: Squamata
- Suborder: Iguania
- Family: Phrynosomatidae
- Genus: Sceloporus
- Species: S. mikeprestoni

Binomial name
- Sceloporus mikeprestoni H.M. Smith & Alvarez, 1974

= Sceloporus mikeprestoni =

Species of lizard

Sceloporus mikeprestoni, Preston's torquate lizard, is a species of lizard in the family Phrynosomatidae. It is endemic to Mexico.

== Taxonomy ==
Originally described as a subspecies, Sceloporus torquatus mikeprestoni, it was recognized as a species in a study published in 2021 based on an integrative analysis of molecular data, environmental niche modeling, and morphological characters.

== Etymology ==
The trivial name, or specific epithet, mikeprestoni is a patronym honoring Dr. Michael J. Preston, Professor of English at the University of Colorado, in recognition of the invaluable support he provided Hobart M. Smith and Rozella B. Smith in preparation of their book series, Synopsis of the Herpetofauna of Mexico. Dr. Preston was vital in the preparation, processing, and accessing of data on an early, 1970s computer.

== Distribution ==
Sceloporus mikeprestoni is endemic to Mexico where it has a highly restricted range in the Sierra Madre Oriental in vicinity of Cerro Peña Nevada (referred to as Peña Blanca in the original description) at elevations of 2,400 m. and higher in a sky island ecosystem. Cerro Peña Nevada is situated on the border of Nuevo León and Tamaulipas.

== Ecology and natural history ==
=== Habitat ===
Sceloporus mikeprestoni is most often associated with boulders and rock outcroppings, taking refuge in cracks and crevices among the rocks when threatened. It will occasionally roam on the ground and fallen logs as well. Temperate Madrean pine-oak woodlands characterize the higher elevations of Cerro Peña Nevada (>2200–3400 m), receiving more frequent rain and milder temperatures than the lower slopes which descend into arid Chihuahuan Desert valleys and scrublands (referred to as Meseta Central matorral by the World Wide Fund for Nature). Surface water on Cerro Peña Nevada is minimal, but afternoon rains are common. Vegetation includes the century plant (Agave americana), Texas madrone (Arbutus xalapensis), mountain juniper (Juniperus monticola), various species of oak trees (Quercus), Sotol (Dasylirion) and pine forest including pinyon pine (Pinus cembroides), Hartweg's pine (Pinus hartwegii), and Johann's pine (Pinus johannis) among others.

=== Reproduction ===
Few if any studies have been published on the reproduction of S. mikeprestoni. However, it is closely related to, and previously considered a subspecies of Sceloporus torquatus, and some information may be inferred from studies on reproduction of that species. Sceloporus torquatus is viviparous, mating in the fall, with parturition taking place in rock crevices in late winter or spring. Litters of six to ten young have been reported for S. torquatus.
