= Thinking Machines Corporation =

American supercomputer and AI firm (1983–1994)

- Type: Private
- Founded: May 1983; 43 years ago Waltham, Massachusetts, U.S.
- Founder: Sheryl Handler; Danny Hillis
- Defunct: 1994; 32 years ago
- Successor: Sun Microsystems; IBM; Ab Initio Software
- Headquarters: Cambridge, Massachusetts, U.S.
- Products: Connection Machine supercomputers; DataVault storage
- Number of employees: c. 1,000

Thinking Machines Corporation (TMC) was a supercomputer manufacturer and artificial intelligence (AI) company, founded in Waltham, Massachusetts, in 1983 by Sheryl Handler and W. Daniel "Danny" Hillis to turn Hillis's doctoral work at the Massachusetts Institute of Technology (MIT) on massively parallel computing architectures into a commercial product named the Connection Machine. The company moved in 1984 from Waltham to Kendall Square in Cambridge, Massachusetts, close to the MIT AI Lab. Thinking Machines made some of the most powerful supercomputers of the time, and by 1993 the four fastest computers in the world were Connection Machines. The firm filed for bankruptcy in 1994; its hardware and parallel computing software divisions were acquired in time by Sun Microsystems.

== Supercomputer products ==
On the hardware side, Thinking Machines produced several Connection Machine models (in chronological order): the CM-1, CM-2, CM-200, CM-5, and CM-5E. The CM-1 and 2 came first in models with 64K (65,536) bit-serial processors (16 processors per chip) and later, the smaller 16K and 4K configurations. The Connection Machine was programmed in a variety of specialized programming languages, including *Lisp and CM Lisp (derived from Common Lisp), C* (derived by Thinking Machines from C), and CM Fortran. These languages used proprietary compilers to translate code into the parallel instruction set of the Connection Machine. The CM-1 through CM-200 were examples of single instruction, multiple data (SIMD) architecture using a hypercube interconnect to reduce hop-count and latency, while the later CM-5 and CM-5E were multiple instruction, multiple data (MIMD) that combined commodity SPARC processors and proprietary vector processors in a fat tree computer network.

All Connection Machine models required a serial front-end processor, which was most often a Sun Microsystems workstation, but on early models could also be a Digital Equipment Corporation (DEC) VAX minicomputer or Symbolics Lisp machine.

Thinking Machines also introduced an early commercial redundant array of independent disks (RAID) 2 disk array, the DataVault, circa 1988.

Thinking Machines computers
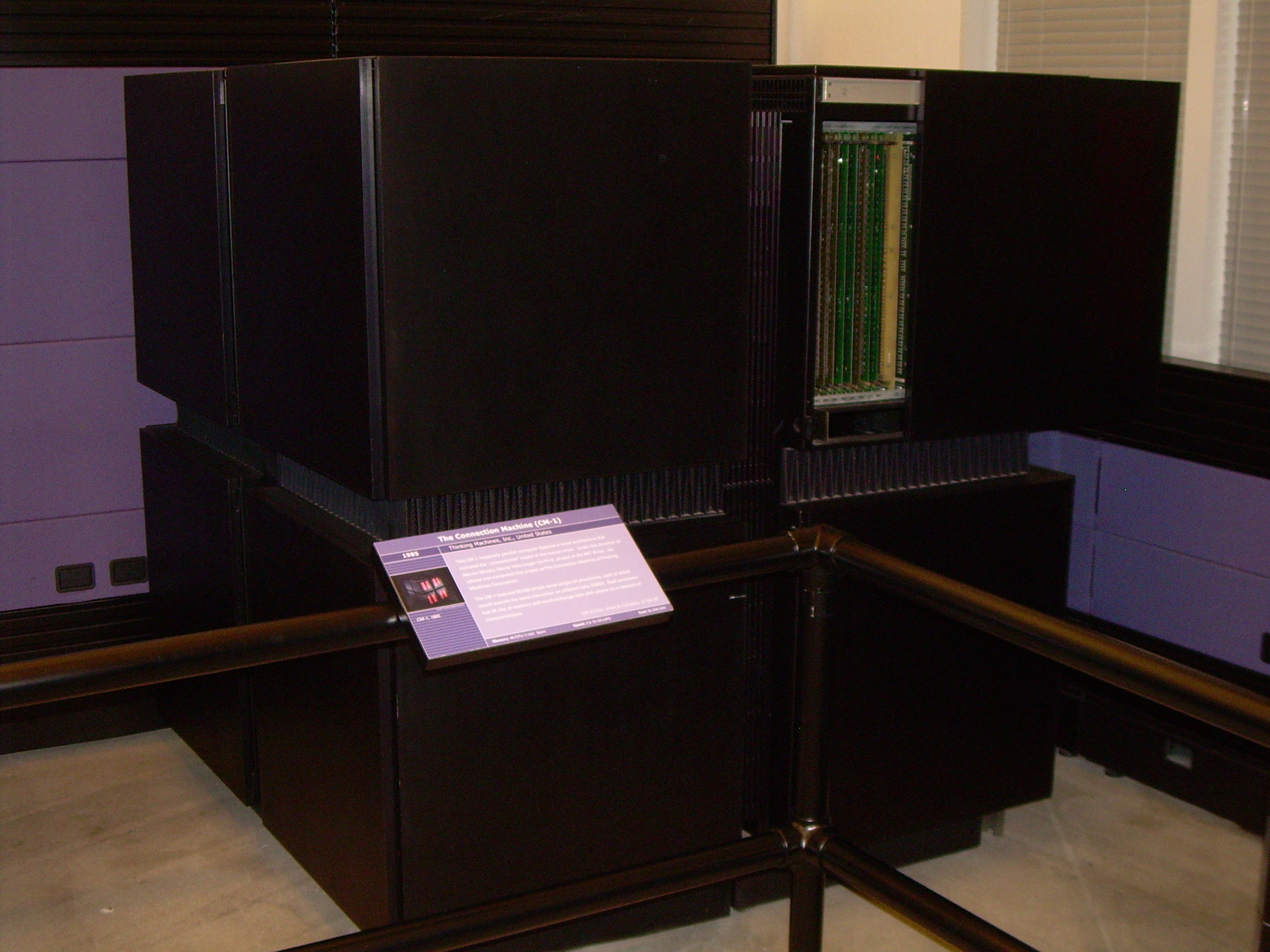
Thinking Machines CM-1 at Computer History Museum. See also a detailed photo.

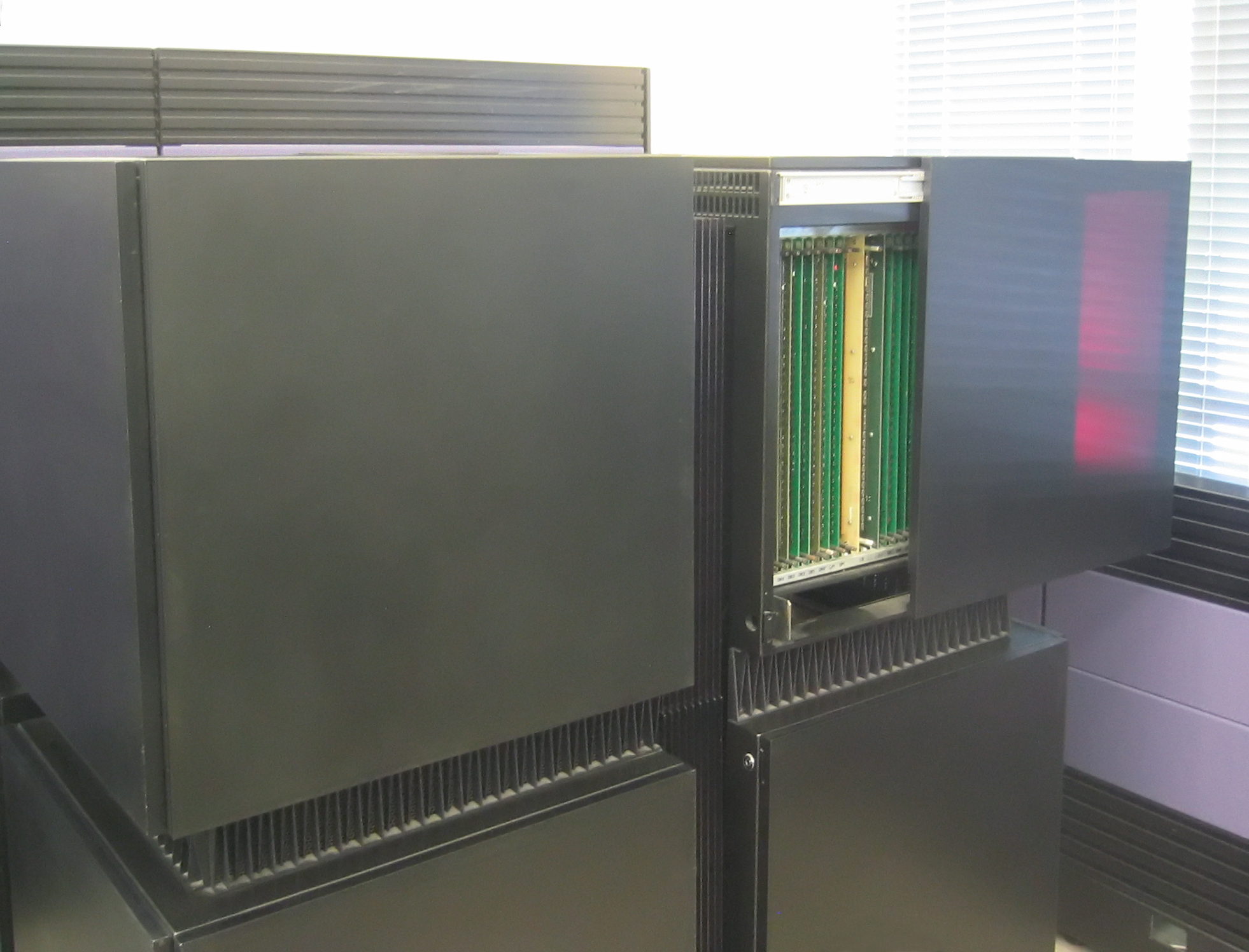
Thinking Machines CM-2 at the Computer History Museum in Mountain View. One of the face plates is partly removed to show the circuit boards inside.

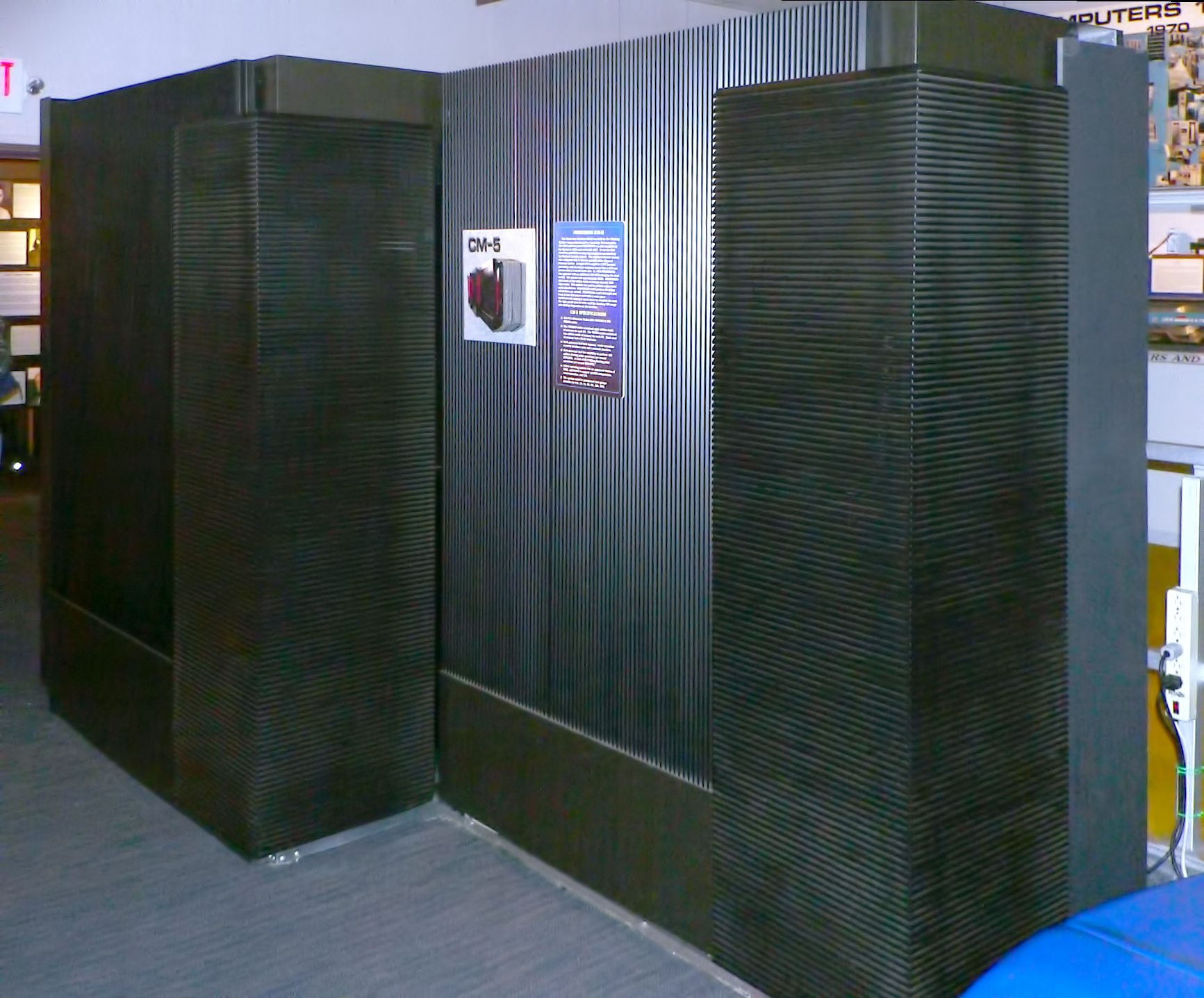
Thinking Machines CM-5 FROSTBURG at the National Cryptologic Museum

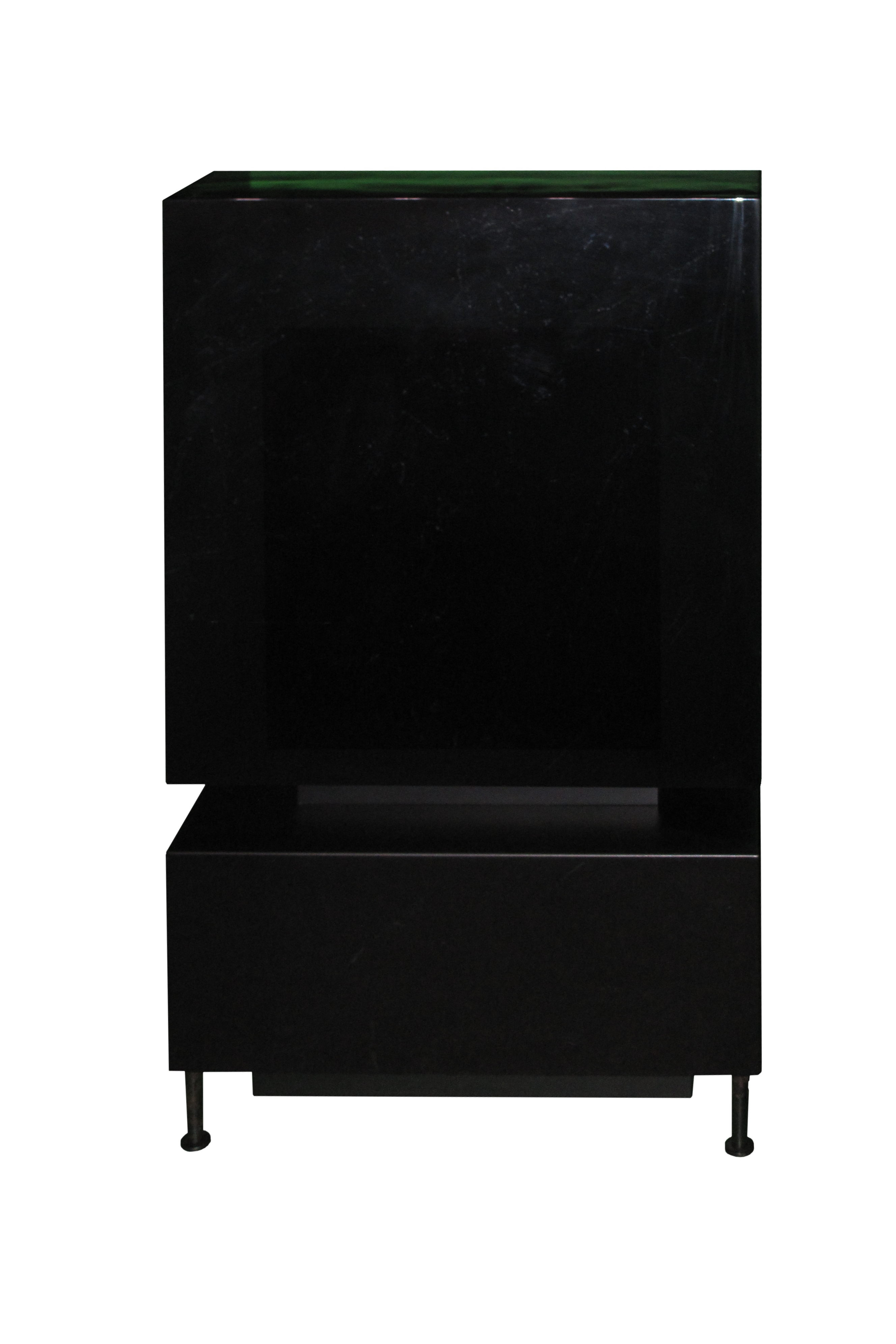
Thinking Machines CM-200 at the Bolo Computer Museum at the École Polytechnique Fédérale de Lausanne (EPFL), Lausanne
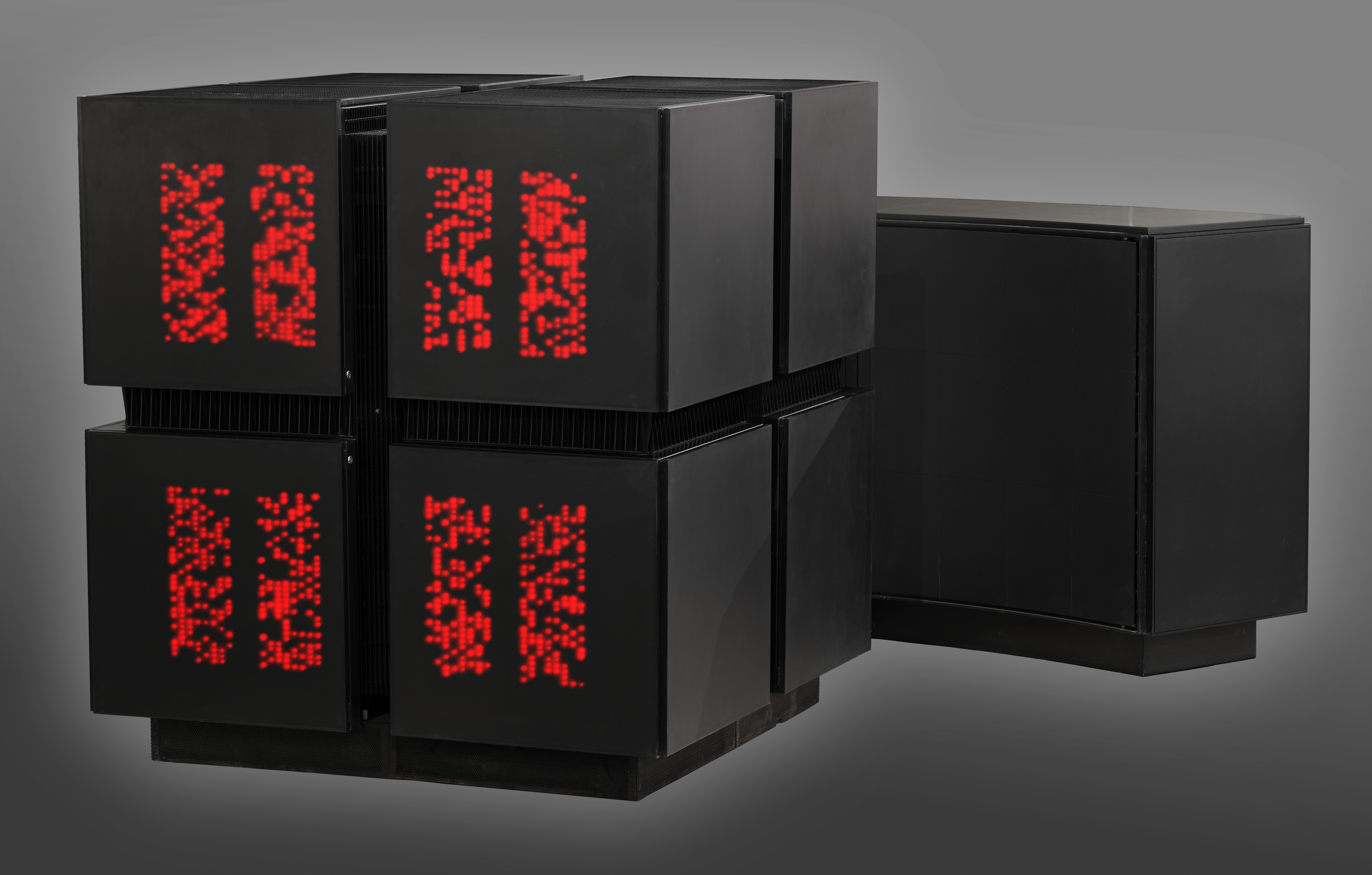
CM-2 at Mimms Museum of Technology and Art

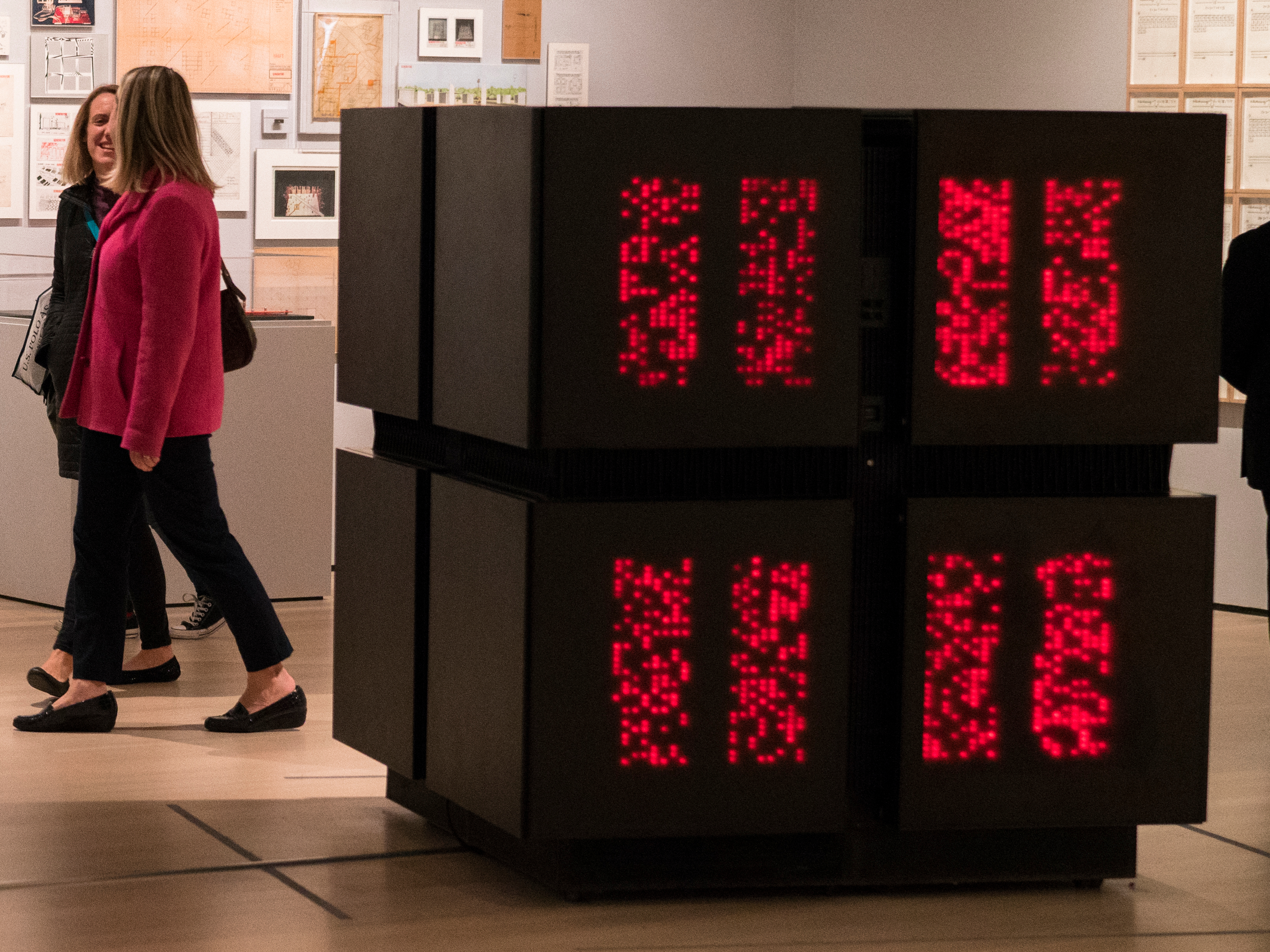
CM-2 at the Museum of Modern Art (MoMA), NYC

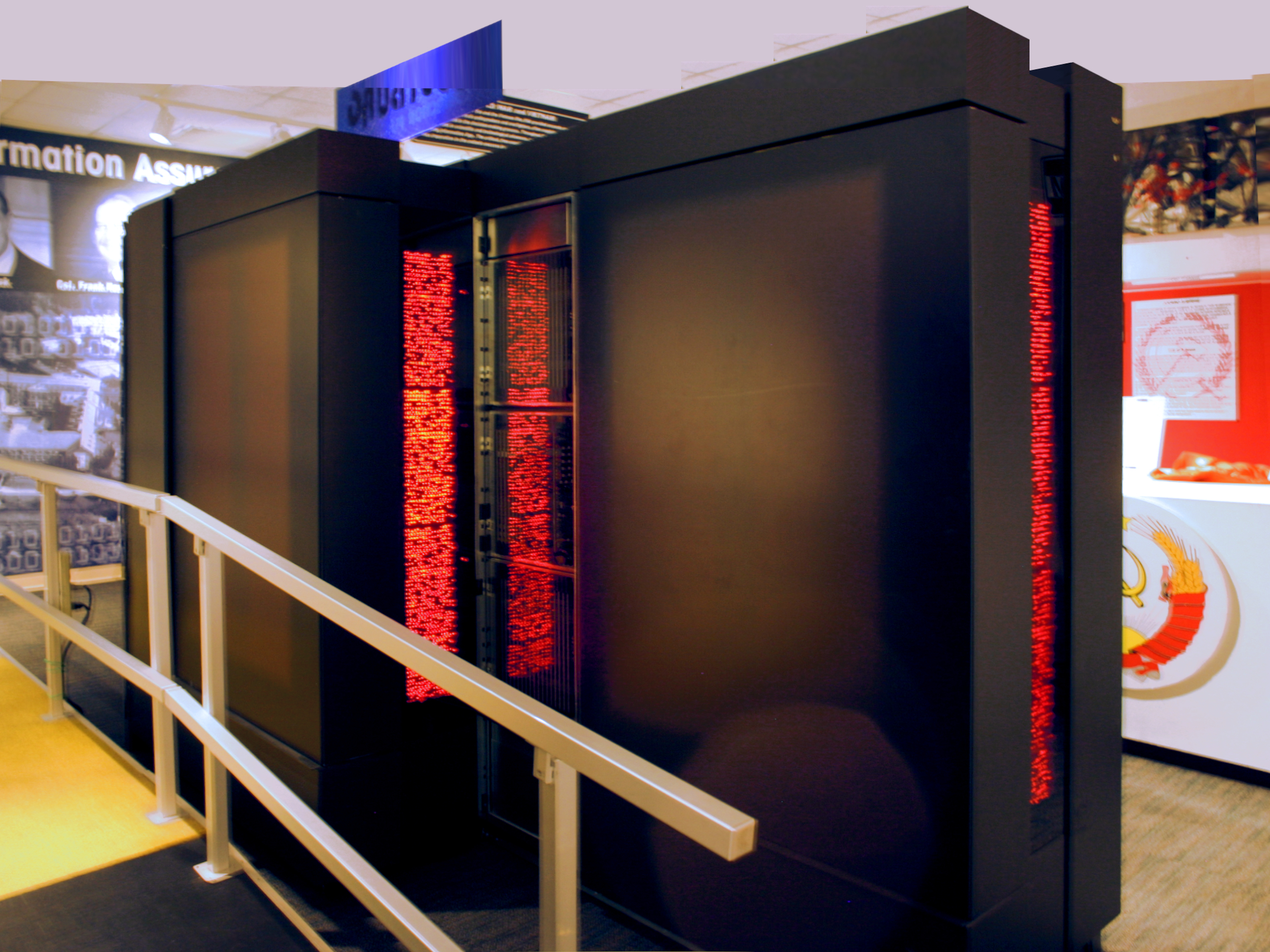
CM-5 at the National Cryptologic Museum

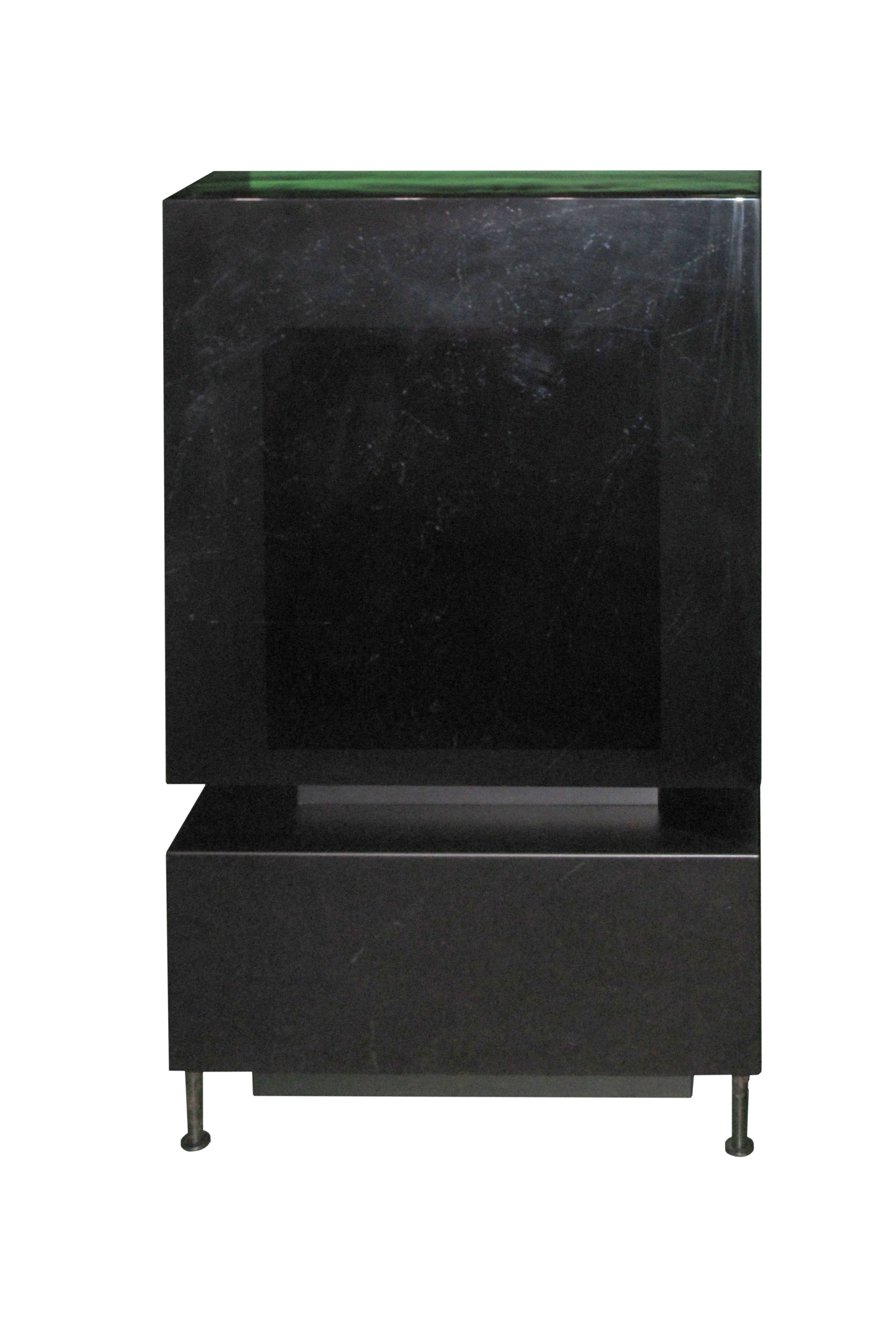
Single cube of CM200.
(On the full configuration, it consists of 8 cubes.)

== Business history ==
In May 1985, Thinking Machines became the third company to register a .com domain name (think.com). The company became profitable in 1989, in part because of its contracts from the Defense Advanced Research Projects Agency (DARPA). The next year, it sold US$65 million worth of hardware and software, making it the market leader in parallel supercomputers. Thinking Machines' primary supercomputer competitor was Cray Research. Other parallel computing competitors included nCUBE, nearby Kendall Square Research, and MasPar, which made a computer similar to the CM-2, and Meiko Scientific, whose CS-2 was similar to the CM-5. In 1991, DARPA and the United States Department of Energy reduced their purchases amid criticism they were unfairly favoring Thinking Machines at the expense of Cray, nCUBE, and MasPar. Tightening export laws also prevented the most powerful Connection Machines from being exported. By 1992, the company was losing money, and CEO Sheryl Handler was forced out.

In August 1994, Thinking Machines filed for Chapter 11 bankruptcy. The hardware portion of the company was purchased by Sun Microsystems, and TMC re-emerged as a small software company specializing in parallel software tools for commodity clusters and data mining software for its installed base and former competitors' parallel supercomputers. In December 1996, the parallel software development section was also acquired by Sun Microsystems.

Thinking Machines continued as a pure data mining company until it was acquired in 1999 by Oracle Corporation. Oracle later acquired Sun Microsystems, thus re-uniting much of Thinking Machines' intellectual property.

The program wide area information server (WAIS), developed at Thinking Machines by Brewster Kahle, would later be influential in starting the Internet Archive and associated projects, including the Rosetta Project as part of Danny Hillis' Clock of the Long Now.

Architect Greg Papadopoulos later became Sun Microsystems's chief technology officer (CTO).

== Dispersal ==
Many of the hardware people left for Sun Microsystems and went on to design the Sun Enterprise series of parallel computers. The Darwin data mining toolkit, developed by Thinking Machines' Business Supercomputer Group, was purchased by Oracle. Most of the team that built Darwin had already left for Dun & Bradstreet soon after Thinking Machines Corporation entered bankruptcy in 1994.

Thinking Machines alumni (known as "Thunkos") helped create several parallel computing software start-ups, including Ab Initio Software; and Applied Parallel Technologies, which was later renamed Torrent Systems and acquired by Ascential Software, which was in turn acquired by IBM.

Besides Hillis, other noted people who worked for or with the company included Robert Millstein, Greg Papadopoulos, David Waltz, Guy L. Steele Jr., Karl Sims, Brewster Kahle, Bradley Kuszmaul, Carl Feynman, Cliff Lasser, Marvin Denicoff, Alex Vasilevsky, Allan Torres, Richard Fishman, Mirza Mehdi, Alan Harshman, Richard Jordan, Alan Mercer, James Bailey, Tsutomu Shimomura. Among the early corporate fellows of Thinking Machines were Marvin Minsky, Douglas Lenat, Stephen Wolfram, Tomaso Poggio, Richard Feynman, and Jack Schwartz, later joined by Charles E. Leiserson, Alan Edelman, Eric Lander, and Lennart Johnsson.

DARPA's Connection Machines were decommissioned by 1996.

== References in popular culture ==
In the 1993 film Jurassic Park, Connection Machines (non-functioning dummies) are visible in the park's control room, programmer Dennis Nedry mentions "eight Connection Machines" and a video about dinosaur cloning mentions "Thinking Machines supercomputers".

In the 1996 film Mission Impossible, Luther Stickell asks Franz Krieger for "Thinking Machine laptops" to help hack into the CIA's Langley supercomputer.

Tom Clancy's novel Rainbow Six speaks of the NSA's "star machine from a company gone bankrupt, the Super-Connector from Thinking Machines, Inc., of Cambridge, Massachusetts" in the NSA's basement. In addition, in The Bear and the Dragon says the National Security Agency could crack nearly any book or cipher with one of three custom operating systems designed for a Thinking Machines supercomputer.

== See also ==
- FROSTBURG – CM-5 used by the National Security Agency
- Goodyear MPP
- ICL Distributed Array Processor
- MasPar
- Parsytec
- SUPRENUM
