= Faxlore =

Urban legends that spread via fax machine

An early example of a faxlore warning about tattoo stickers allegedly laced with drugs, an urban legend collected by Jan Brunvand in his book The Choking Doberman

Faxlore is a sort of folklore: humorous texts, folk poetry, folk art, and urban legends that are circulated, not by word of mouth, but by fax machine. Xeroxlore or photocopylore is similar material circulated by photocopying.

The first use of the term xeroxlore was in Michael J. Preston's essay "Xerox-lore", 1974. "Photocopylore" is perhaps the most frequently encountered name for the phenomenon now, because of trademark concerns involving the Xerox Corporation. The first use of this term came in A Dictionary of English Folklore by Jacqueline Simpson and Steve Roud.

== Material circulated in faxlore ==
Achtung!

Alles turisten und nonteknischen lookenpeepers!

Das maschine-kontrol ist nicht für der gefingerpoken und mittengraben! Oderwise ist easy to schnappen der springenwerk, blowenfusen und poppencorken mit spitzensparksen.

Der maschine ist diggen bei experten only!

Ist nicht für gewerken bei dummkopfen. Der rubbernecken sightseeren keepen das cottonpicken händer in das pockets.

Zo relaxen und watschen der blinkenlights.

— A common example of faxlore is the mock German variation of the "Blinkenlights" poster

Some faxlore is relatively harmless. Cartoons and jokes often circulate as faxlore, the poor graphic quality becoming worse with each new person who resends the joke to the next recipient. Because faxlore and xeroxlore is the (mis)appropriation of technology owned by the employer, much humorous faxlore is mildly subversive of the workplace and its values. Like email and chain letters, office technology has given new life to various forms of practical jokes, urban legends, and folklore. The items are often office-related, such as spoof agenda for meetings, spurious descriptions of ridiculous training programs that all staff will allegedly be required to attend, and so on. Names may be whited out and replaced with someone in the office, making it a joke on a particular person, or details may be altered making an item more topical.

The semi-traditional lists of reasons "why a cucumber is better than a man" or "why a beer is better than a woman" often circulate as faxlore, as has the well known mock German variations of the "Blinkenlights" poster. Another commonly circulated text contains ethnic humor; a typical version goes:

Heaven is where the police are British, the lovers French, the mechanics German, the chefs Italian, and it is all organized by the Swiss. Hell is where the police are German, the lovers Swiss, the mechanics French, the chefs British, and it is all organized by the Italians.

Materials of this sort have existed from the beginnings of duplicating technologies. World War II era blueprints exist of drawings of female nudes with their body parts labeled as if they were the parts of airplanes. With the widespread adoption of photocopying, amateur duplication of this sort of material became available to a much larger social base. Cartoons and other amateur materials were distributed in the workplace, usually in violation of managerial restrictions on the use of office supplies, and often in disregard of copyright law.

Later, during the early 1990s, the widespread adoption of telecopiers made it possible to duplicate these materials remotely. The use of a fax machine to duplicate these materials also changed the emphases of their subjects; various alarms and urban legends were propagated to distant readers over the telephone lines. This use of fax has been somewhat supplanted by email as that technology became more widely used and embedded in the culture; the sort of urban legends that once circulated by fax are now likely to appear as email hoaxes. Specific computer related alarms are the subject of virus hoaxes; email makes forwarding of texts relatively easy, and the frightening nature of the revelation makes it seem important to pass along, despite any doubts the sender might have.

== Faxlore and urban legends ==
Other sorts of faxlore have had more serious consequences. A number of more notorious urban legends have circulated in faxlore. The notorious "Blue Star Acid" hoax is one well known example.

The "lights out" hoax, which claimed that people who were driving in the dark with their headlights out might be gang members, and that those who flashed their headlights at these drivers might be marked for murder as part of a gang initiation, was another hoax that was widely circulated as faxlore. The poor graphic quality of the frequently re-sent faxes, which often were made out to appear to have originated with the police department of a distant city, only made these hoaxes seem more credible.

== Legal aspects ==
In the United States, collections of supposedly sinister symbols have been circulated among school administrators and police departments; in the 1980s these symbols were frequently alleged to be "Satanic symbols", and in the 1990s they were alleged to be "gang symbols". Political or religious symbols, like the peace symbol, the Star of David, the Rosary, the ankh, or the pentagram were mingled with other cryptic or fanciful symbols in these faxed and recirculated sheets, and the entire collection was condemned.

On the authority of these anonymous, hard-to-trace, and impossible-to-cross-examine sources, school administrators sometimes acted to ban the wearing of Stars of David and similar symbols of minority religions. Typically, no compiler or author is given for the collection of symbols, though frightening descriptions are often given about their "secret meaning." A number of civil liberties lawsuits were filed over actions taken by school administrators who took these anonymous sources seriously.

A similar claim that the Procter & Gamble logo was a "satanic symbol" was linked in the 1980s to the activity of several Amway distributors, Amway being one of Procter & Gamble's competitors; the hoax was spread by fax, photocopier, and later by voice mail and email. Another occasional hoax claims that clothing and memorabilia of various universities or sports teams are "gang symbols".

== Growing obsolescence ==
With the rise of the Internet, media such as World Wide Web, email, instant messaging, and social networking sites are now available to quickly and widely spread the sort of material that formerly circulated as faxlore. The hoax warnings of things such as dire and terrible computer viruses that still occasionally circulate, carry on one tradition of the bogus cautionary tale that used to circulate as faxlore, now known as copypasta (an altered compound of common computer functions copy and paste).

== See also ==
- Junk fax
- Meme
- Samizdat
