= CM5 =

CM5 may refer to:

- Connection Machine CM5 supercomputer
- Part of the British CM postcode area
- Cocaine Muzik 5, a mixtape by rapper Yo Gotti.
- The CM5 Electrocardiography lead configuration (right arm electrode on manubrium, left arm electrode on V5 and indifferent lead on left shoulder), used to detect left ventricular ischaemia during general anaesthesia.
- Raspberry Pi Compute Module 5, an announced board similar to the Compute Module 4.
