= Ab initio (disambiguation) =

Ab initio is a Latin term used in English, meaning from the beginning.

Ab initio may also refer to:

- Ab Initio (company), an ETL Tool Software Company in the field of Data Warehousing
- Ab initio quantum chemistry methods
- Marriages annulled under the Catholic Church are considered as annulled ab initio, meaning that the marriage was invalid from the beginning
