= Dataparallel C =

Programming language based on C with parallel extensions

Dataparallel C is a programming language based on C with parallel extensions by Philip Hatcher and Michael Quinn of the University of New Hampshire. Dataparallel C was based on an early version of C* and ran on the Intel iPSC/2 and nCUBE.
