= *Lisp =

Programming language

*Lisp (StarLisp)
- Paradigms: Multi-paradigm: functional, procedural, reflective, meta, parallel
- Family: Lisp
- Designed by: Cliff Lasser, Steve Omohundro
- Developer: Thinking Machines Corporation
- First appeared: 1986; 40 years ago
- Typing discipline: Dynamic, strong
- Scope: Static, lexical
- Implementation language: Common Lisp
- Platform: Connection Machine
- OS: Connection Machine

Influenced by
- Lisp, Common Lisp

Influenced
- C*

*Lisp (or StarLisp) is a programming language, a dialect of the language Lisp. It was conceived of in 1985 by two employees of the Thinking Machines Corporation, Cliff Lasser and Steve Omohundro, as a way to provide an efficient yet high-level language for programming the nascent Connection Machine (CM).

== History ==
=== Prelude ===
At the time the Connection Machine was being designed and built, the only language being actively developed for it was an assembly-level language named PARIS (Parallel Instruction Set). It became evident that a better way to program the machine was needed, and quickly. Waiting for the completion of Connection Machine Lisp (CM Lisp), an implementation of the very high-level programming language Lisp with parallel computing extensions, was not an option. CM Lisp had been proposed by Danny Hillis, and development was expected to continue for several more years.

=== Development ===
A *Lisp interpreter was initially developed. It became apparent quickly that a *Lisp compiler, translating *Lisp into Lisp and PARIS, would be needed to attain the gigaFLOPS speed that was attainable in theory by a Connection Machine. The *Lisp compiler was written by Jeff Mincy and was first released in 1986. An application achieving more than two gigaFLOPS, a helicopter wake simulator, was developed by Alan Egolf, then an employee of United Technologies, and J. P. Massar, a Thinking Machines employee, in 1987.

A *Lisp Simulator, an emulator meant to run *Lisp code on standard, non-parallel machines, was developed at the same time by J. P. Massar. This simulator still exists and was ported to American National Standards Institute (ANSI) Common Lisp (CL) in 2001. An older version, written in the original CL, exists in the Carnegie Mellon University (CMU) artificial intelligence (AI) repository.

Later versions of *Lisp, involving significant upgrades to its functions and performance, were worked on by Cliff Lasser, Jeff Mincy, and J. P. Massar through 1989. *Lisp was implemented on the Thinking Machines CM5 circa 1990–1991 by J. P. Massar and Mario Bourgoin.

Timeline of Lisp dialects
1958	1960	1965	1970	1975	1980	1985	1990	1995	2000	2005	2010	2015	2020
LISP 1, 1.5, LISP 2^{(abandoned)}
		Maclisp
			Interlisp
			MDL
				Lisp Machine Lisp
				Scheme				R5RS		R6RS	R7RS small
				NIL
					ZIL (Zork Implementation Language)
					Franz Lisp
					muLisp
					Common Lisp		ANSI standard
					Le Lisp
					MIT Scheme
					XLISP
						T
						Chez Scheme
						Emacs Lisp
						AutoLISP
						PicoLisp
						Gambit
							EuLisp
							ISLISP
							OpenLisp
							PLT Scheme				Racket
							newLISP
							GNU Guile
									Visual LISP
										Clojure
										Arc
										LFE
											Hy

== Implementation ==
StarLisp was written on Common Lisp (CL) and thus had the full power of CL behind it. To use a Connection Machine, one needed a host or front-end. To use *Lisp, that front-end had to run CL. Symbolics's machines using Genera and Sun Microsystems workstations running Lucid Inc.'s Lucid Common Lisp were both used to operate *Lisp.

StarLisp operated on Parallel Variables (PVARS). These represented Connection Machine memory and were essentially vectors: one element per CM processor (or virtual processor).

StarLisp consisted of standard operations on PVARS, like vector addition and multiplication, along with communication primitives that essentially reordered the elements of a PVAR using the CM's communication hardware to optimally route the data.
