= Lennart Johnsson =

Swedish computer scientist and engineer (born 1944)

Johnsson in 2006

Lennart Johnsson (born 1944) is a Swedish computer scientist and engineer.

Johnsson started his career at ABB in Sweden and moved on to UCLA, Caltech, Yale University, Harvard University, the Royal Institute of Technology (KTH in Sweden), and Thinking Machines Corporation. He is currently based at the University of Houston, where he holds the Hugh and Lillie Roy Cranz Cullen Distinguished Chair of Computer Science, Mathematics, and Electrical and Computer Engineering as a lecturer at a summer school at the KTH PDC Center for High Performance Computing.
