= Greg Papadopoulos =

American businessman (born 1958)

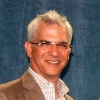
- Born: Gregory Michael Papadopoulos; 1958 (age 67–68)
- Education: UCSD; MIT
- Scientific career
- Fields: High-performance computing
- Workplaces: Sun Microsystems
- Doctoral advisor: Arvind (computer scientist)

Gregory Michael Papadopoulos (born 1958) is an American engineer, computer scientist, executive, and venture capitalist. He is the creator and lead proponent for Redshift, a theory on whether technology markets are over or under-served by Moore's Law.

== Biography ==
Papadopoulos received a B.A. in systems science from the University of California, San Diego in 1979, and an S.M. and Ph.D. in electrical engineering and computer science from the Massachusetts Institute of Technology (MIT) in 1983 and 1988. At some time he held positions at Hewlett-Packard and Honeywell. While a graduate student, he worked at the MIT spinoff PictureTel in its early days. His dissertation was on a dataflow architecture microprocessor, under his advisor Arvind. Along with David E. Culler, he developed a simplified approach to dataflow execution in a project named Monsoon.

Papadopoulos became assistant professor at MIT in 1988 and associate professor in May 1993. He helped start Ergo Computing in 1988, and Exa Corporation in 1991. He was chief architect at Thinking Machines Corporation starting in 1992. His research applied massively parallel techniques to high-performance computing.

He joined Sun Microsystems in September 1994. After serving as chief scientist for the server division, in December 1995 he became chief technical officer (CTO) of SMCC (Sun's hardware division), and CTO of the entire company in April 1998. He left Sun in February 2010.

Papadopoulos co-authored (with David Douglas and John Boutelle) the book Citizen Engineer: A Handbook for Socially Responsible Engineering, published in 2009. At the time he lived in Los Gatos, California.

In 2010 Papadopoulos joined the venture capital firm New Enterprise Associates (NEA) as an executive in residence and the Computer History Museum as a director. In April, 2011, Papadopoulos became a partner at NEA. At some time, he was chairman of the board of trustees for the SETI Institute.
