= Redshift (theory) =

Redshift is a techno-economic theory suggesting hypersegmentation of information technology markets based on whether individual computing needs are over or under-served by Moore's law, which predicts the doubling of computing transistors (and therefore roughly computing power) every two years. The theory, proposed and named by New Enterprise Associates partner and former Sun Microsystems CTO Greg Papadopoulos, categorized a series of high growth markets (redshifting) while predicting slower GDP-driven growth in traditional computing markets (blueshifting). Papadopoulos predicted the result will be a fundamental redesign of components comprising computing systems.

== Hypergrowth market segments (redshifting) ==
According to the Redshift theory, applications "redshift" when they grow dramatically faster than Moore's Law allows, growing quickly in their absolute number of systems. In these markets, customers are running out of datacenter real-estate, power and cooling infrastructure. According to Dell Senior Vice President Brad Anderson, “Businesses requiring hyperscale computing environments – where infrastructure deployments are measured by up to millions of servers, storage and networking equipment – are changing the way they approach IT.”

While various Redshift proponents offer minor alterations on the original presentation, “Redshifting” generally includes:

=== ΣBW (Sum-of-Bandwidth) ===
These are companies that drive heavy Internet traffic. This includes popular web-portals like Google, Yahoo, AOL and MSN. It also includes telecoms, multimedia, television over IP, online games like World of Warcraft and others. This segment has been enabled by widespread availability of high-bandwidth Internet connections to consumers through a DSL or cable modem. A simple way to understand this market is that for every byte of content served to a PC, mobile phone or other device over a network, there must exist computing systems to send it over the network.

=== High performance computing (HPC) ===
These are companies that do complex simulations that involve (for example) weather, stock markets or drug-design simulations. This is a generally elastic market because businesses frequently spend every "available" dollar budgeted for IT. A common anecdote claims that cutting the cost of computing by half causes customers in this segment to buy at least twice as much, because each marginal IT dollar spent contributes to business advantage.

=== *prise (or "Star-prise") ===
These are companies that aggregate traditional computing applications and offer them as services, typically in the form of Software as a Service (SaaS). For example, companies that deploy CRM are over-served by Moore's Law, but companies that aggregate CRM functions and offer them as a service, such as Salesforce.com, grow faster than Moore's Law.

=== The eBay crisis ===
A prime example of redshift was a crisis at eBay. In 1999 eBay suffered a database crisis when a single Oracle Database running on the fastest Sun machine available (these tracking Moore's law in this period) was not enough to cope with eBay's growth. The solution was to massively parallelise their system architecture.

== Traditional computing markets (blueshifting) ==
Redshift theory suggests that traditional computing markets, such as those serving enterprise resource planning or customer relationship management applications, have reached relative saturation in industrialized nations. Thereafter, proponents argued further market growth will closely follow gross domestic product growth, which typically remains under 10% for most countries annually. Given that Moore's Law continues to predict accurately the rate of computing transistor growth, which roughly translates into computing power doubling every two years, the Redshift theory suggests that traditional computing markets will ultimately contract as a percentage of computing expenditures over time.

Functionally, this means “Blueshifting” customers can satisfy computing requirement growth by swapping in faster processors without increasing the absolute number of computing systems.

== Consequences and industry commentary ==
Papadopoulos argued that while traditional computing markets remain the dominant source of revenue through the late 2000s, a shift to hypergrowth markets will inevitably occur. When that shift occurs, he argued computing (but not computers) will become a utility, and differentiation in the IT market will be based upon a company's ability to deliver computing at massive scale, efficiently and with predictable service levels, much like electricity at that time.

If computing is to be delivered as a utility, Nicholas Carr suggested Papadopoulos' vision compares with Microsoft researcher Jim Hamilton, who both agree that computing is most efficiently generated in shipping containers. Industry analysts are also beginning to quantify Redshifting and Blueshifting markets. According to International Data Corporation vice president Matthew Eastwood, "IDC believes that the IT market is in a period of hyper segmentation... This a class of customers that is Moore's law driven and as price performance gains continue, IDC believes that these organizations will accelerate their consumption of IT infrastructure.”

== History and nomenclature ==
Key portions of Papadopoulos' theory were first presented by Sun Microsystems CEO Jonathan Schwartz in late 2006. Papadopoulos later gave a full presentation on Redshift to Sun's annual Analyst Summit in February 2007. The term Redshift refers to what happens when electromagnetic radiation, usually visible light, moves away from an observer. Papadopoulos chose this term to reflect growth markets because redshift helped cosmologists explain the expansion of the universe.

Papadopoulos originally depicted traditional IT markets as green to represent their revenue base, but later changed them to “blueshift,” which occurs when a light source moves toward an observer, similar to what would happen during a contraction of the universe.
