= Sheryl Handler =

American businesswoman

Sheryl Handler (born 1955) is an American businesswoman recognized as one of the founders of Thinking Machines. She is the founder and CEO of Ab Initio.

== Education and career ==
Handler attended Case Western Reserve University for interior design and received her master's degree in landscape architecture from Harvard University. Handler had previously participated in the start-up of the Genetics Institute at Harvard and was pursuing her doctorate in city planning at MIT when she met Danny Hillis, a fellow MIT graduate student working on parallel computing. Hillis and his PhD advisor, Marvin Minsky, were looking to market a connection machine as a tool with which to develop software programs for artificial intelligence. Handler helped found the Thinking Machines Corporation, where she served as CEO until 1992. After Thinking Machines went bankrupt in 1995, Handler and several other former employees founded Ab Initio Software.
