= Pirate game =

Simple mathematical game

The pirate game is a simple mathematical game. It is a multi-player version of the ultimatum game.

== The game ==
There are five rational pirates (in strict decreasing order of seniority A, B, C, D and E) who found 100 gold coins. They must decide how to distribute them.

The pirate world's rules of distribution say that the most senior pirate first proposes a plan of distribution. The pirates, including the proposer, then vote on whether to accept this distribution. If the majority accepts the plan, the coins are disbursed and the game ends. In case of a tie vote, the proposer has the casting vote. If the majority rejects the plan, the proposer is thrown overboard from the pirate ship and dies, and the next most senior pirate makes a new proposal to begin the system again. The process repeats until a plan is accepted or if there is one pirate left.

Pirates base their decisions on four factors:

1. Each pirate wants to survive.
2. Given survival, each pirate wants to maximize the number of gold coins he receives.
3. Each pirate would prefer to throw another overboard, if all other results would otherwise be equal.
4. The pirates do not trust each other, and will neither make nor honor any promises between pirates apart from a proposed distribution plan that gives a whole number of gold coins to each pirate.

== The result ==
To increase the chance of their plan being accepted, one might expect that Pirate A will have to offer the other pirates most of the gold. However, this is far from the theoretical result. When each of the pirates votes, they will not just be thinking about the current proposal, but also other outcomes down the line. In addition, the order of seniority is known in advance so each of them can accurately predict how the others might vote in any scenario. This becomes apparent if we work backwards.

The final possible scenario would have all the pirates except D and E thrown overboard. Since D is senior to E, they have the casting vote; so, D would propose to keep 100 for themself and 0 for E.

If there are three left (C, D and E), C knows that D will offer E 0 in the next round; therefore, C has to offer E one coin in this round to win E's vote. Therefore, when only three are left the allocation is C:99, D:0, E:1.

If B, C, D and E remain, B can offer 1 to D; because B has the casting vote, only D's vote is required. Thus, B proposes B:99, C:0, D:1, E:0.

(In the previous round, one might consider proposing B:99, C:0, D:0, E:1, as E knows it won't be possible to get more coins, if any, if E throws B overboard. But, as each pirate is eager to throw the others overboard, E would prefer to kill B, to get the same amount of gold from C.)

With this knowledge, A can count on C and E's support for the following allocation, which is the final solution:

- A: 98 coins
- B: 0 coins
- C: 1 coin
- D: 0 coins
- E: 1 coin

(Note: A:98, B:0, C:0, D:1, E:1 or other variants are not good enough, as D would rather throw A overboard to get the same amount of gold from B.)

== Extension ==
The solution follows the same general pattern for other numbers of pirates and/or coins. However, the game changes in character when it is extended beyond there being twice as many pirates as there are coins. Ian Stewart wrote about Steve Omohundro's extension to an arbitrary number of pirates in the May 1999 edition of Scientific American and described the rather intricate pattern that emerges in the solution.

Supposing there are just 100 gold pieces, then:

- Pirate #201 as captain can stay alive only by offering all the gold one each to the lowest odd-numbered pirates, keeping none.
- Pirate #202 as captain can stay alive only by taking no gold and offering one gold each to 100 pirates who would not receive a gold coin from #201. Therefore, there are 101 possible recipients of these one gold coin bribes being the 100 even-numbered pirates up to 200 and number #201. Since there are no constraints as to which 100 of these 101 they will choose, any choice is equally good and they can be thought of as choosing at random. This is how chance begins to enter the considerations for higher-numbered pirates.
- Pirate #203 as captain will not have enough gold available to bribe a majority, and so will die.
- Pirate #204 as captain has #203's vote secured without bribes: #203 will only survive if #204 also survives. So #204 can remain safe by reaching 102 votes by bribing 100 pirates with one gold coin each. This seems most likely to work by bribing odd-numbered pirates optionally including #202, who will get nothing from #203. However, it may also be possible to bribe others instead as they only have a 100/101 chance of being offered a gold coin by pirate #202.
- With 205 pirates, all pirates bar #205 prefer to kill #205 unless given gold, so #205 is doomed as captain.
- Similarly with 206 or 207 pirates, only votes of #205 to #206/7 are secured without gold which is insufficient votes, so #206 and #207 are also doomed.
- For 208 pirates, the votes of self-preservation from #205, #206, and #207 without any gold are enough to allow #208 to reach 104 votes and survive.

In general, if G is the number of gold pieces and N (> 2G) is the number of pirates, then

- All pirates whose number is less than or equal to 2G + M will survive, where M is the highest power of 2 that does not exceed N – 2G.
- Any pirates whose number exceeds 2G + M will die.
- Any pirate whose number is greater than 2G + M/2 will receive no gold.
- There is no unique solution as to who gets one gold coin and who does not if the number of pirates is 2G+2 or greater. A simple solution dishes out one gold to the odd or even pirates up to 2G depending whether M is an even or odd power of 2.

Another way to see this is to realize that every pirate M will have the vote of all the pirates from M/2 + 1 to M out of self preservation since their survival is secured only with the survival of the pirate M. Because the highest ranking pirate can break the tie, the captain only needs the votes of half of the pirates over 2G, which only happens each time (2G + a Power of 2) is reached. For instance, with 100 gold pieces and 500 pirates, pirates #500 through #457 die, and then #456 survives (as 456 = 200 + 2^{8}) as they have the 128 guaranteed self-preservation votes of pirates #329 through #456, plus 100 votes from the pirates they bribe, making up the 228 votes that they need. The numbers of pirates past #200 who can guarantee their survival as captain with 100 gold pieces are #201, #202, #204, #208, #216, #232, #264, #328, #456, #712, etc.: they are separated by longer and longer strings of pirates who are doomed no matter what division they propose.

== See also ==
- Creative problem solving
- Lateral thinking
