= Cryptanalytic computer =

Computer used for cryptanalysis

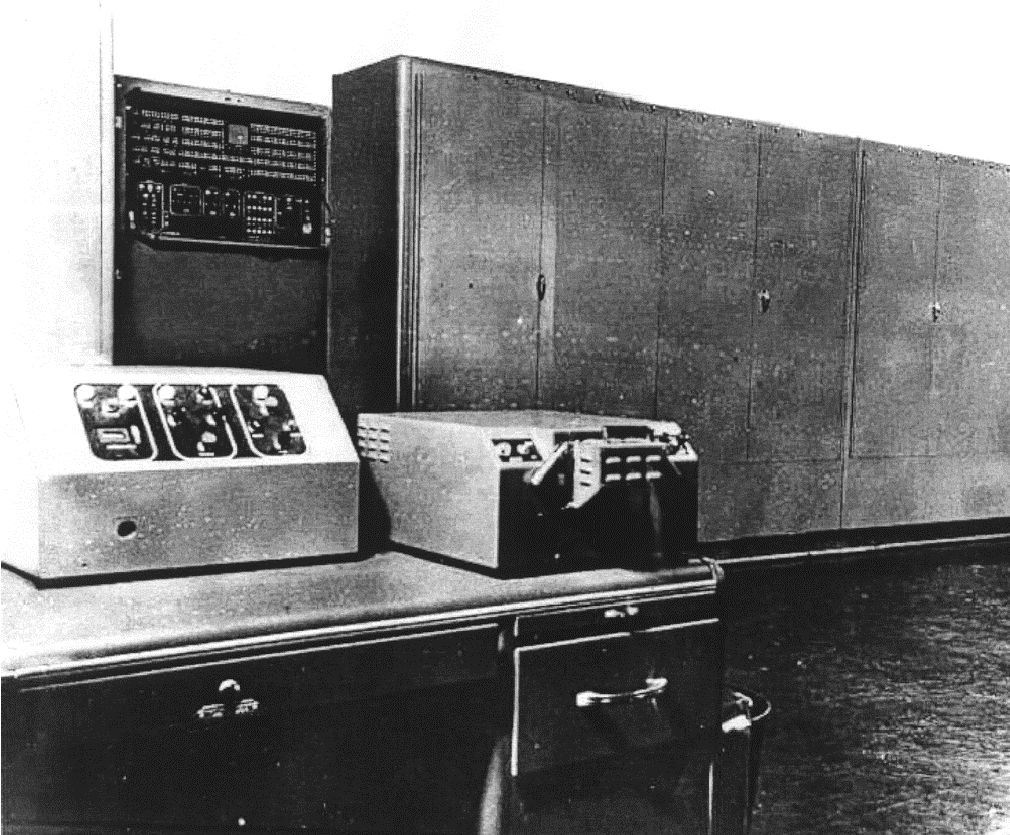
ATLAS

A cryptanalytic computer is a computer designed to be used for cryptanalysis, which nowadays involves massive statistical analysis and multiple trial decryptions that since before World War II are possible only with automated equipment. Polish cryptanalysts designed and built automated aids in their work on Enigma traffic. Arguably, the first modern computer (digital, electronic, and somewhat programmable) was built for cryptanalytic work at Bletchley Park (the Colossus) during the war. More modern computers were important after World War II, and some machines (like the Cray-1) are reported to have had machine instructions hardwired in at the request of NSA.

Computers continue to be important in cryptanalysis well into the 21st century. NSA, in fact, is said to have the largest number of installed computers on the planet. Whether this is true in an age of Google computer farms and such is doubtful but remains publicly unknown.

== See also ==
- Bomba (cryptography)
- Bombe
- Colossus computer
- Deep crack
- FROSTBURG
- IBM 7950 Harvest
