= Bugbook Historical Computer Museum =

Former computer museum in Floyd, Virginia

The Bugbook Historical Microcomputer Museum was a small display of several hundred key items from the collection of computer hobbyist David G. Larsen. The Museum was developed and maintained by the LCF Group (David & Gaynell Larsen and Dee Wallace) in Floyd, Virginia from 2008-2016. The name of the museum comes from the Bugbooks and Blacksburg Continuing Education Books, a series of instructional books created by the "Blacksburg Group" during the late 1970s and 1980s. David was a part of the group. The museum closed in May 2016 and Larsen donated the majority of his collection to what would become the Mimms Museum of Technology and Art in Roswell, Georgia.

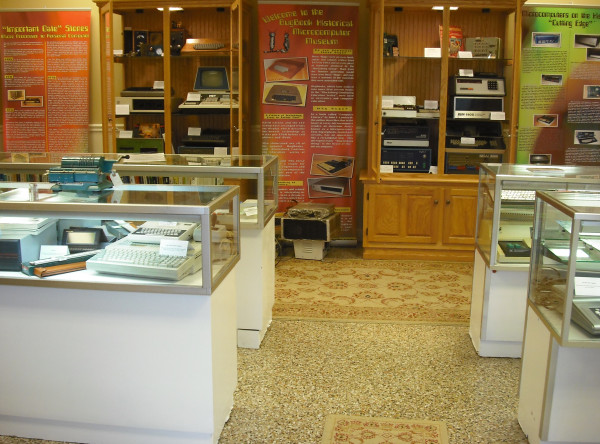
Bugbook Museum display

== History ==
The museum curator, David Larsen, collected computer artifacts and memorabilia for over forty years. He was interested in electronics at an early age and had his start in computers in 1957 with a Navy assignment at Remington Rand UNIVAC St. Paul. His entire career has involved electronics and microcomputers. This includes 31 years as a Virginia Tech faculty member teaching instrumentation and automation. He is also an amateur radio operator and has been for six decades.

=== Significant collection items ===
The museum itself was focused on the period from 1971-1981 when personal computers were first in production. Among the items that the museum featured were:

- Apple I exact operational clone on display and four original Apple-1 computers in collection shown by special request.
- Mark-8
- Altair 8800 low serial number #21
- Commodore 64

== See also ==
- List of computer museums
