= FROSTBURG =

Supercomputer

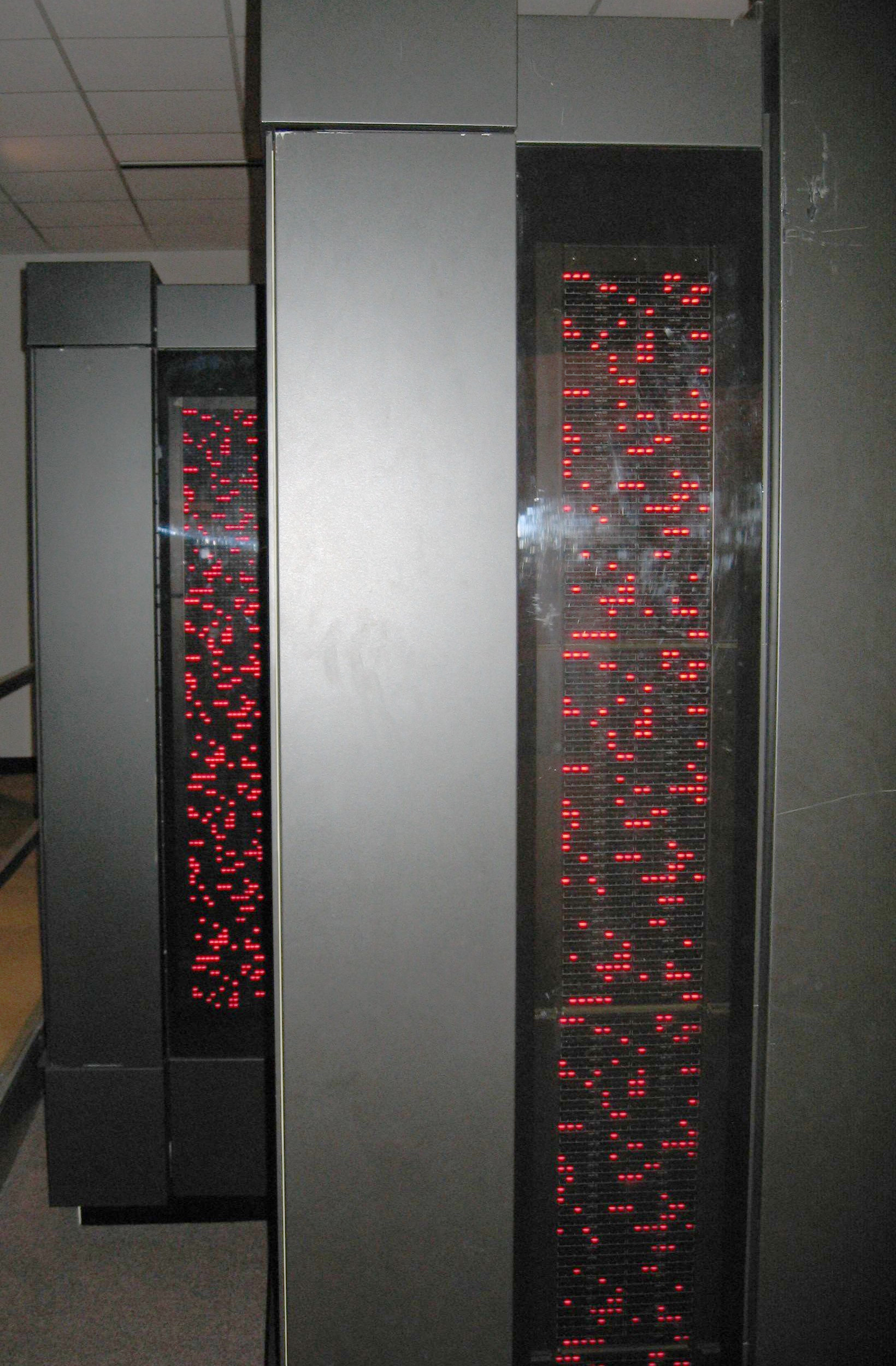
FROSTBURG on display at the National Cryptologic Museum. The light panels were used to check the usage of the processing nodes, and to run diagnostics.

FROSTBURG was a Connection Machine 5 (CM-5) massively parallel supercomputer used by the US National Security Agency (NSA) to perform mathematical calculations. The CM-5 was built by the Thinking Machines Corporation, based in Cambridge, Massachusetts, at a cost of US$25 million. The system was installed at NSA in 1991, and operated until 1997. It was the first massively parallel processing computer bought by NSA, originally containing 256 processing nodes. The system was upgraded in 1993 with another 256 nodes, for a total of 512 nodes. The system had a total of 500 billion 32-bit words (≈ 2 terabytes) of storage, 2.5 billion words (≈ 10 gigabytes) of memory, and could perform at a theoretical maximum 65.5 gigaFLOPS. The operating system CMost was based on Unix, but optimized for parallel processing.

FROSTBURG is now on display at the National Cryptologic Museum.

== See also ==
- HARVEST
- Cryptanalytic computer
