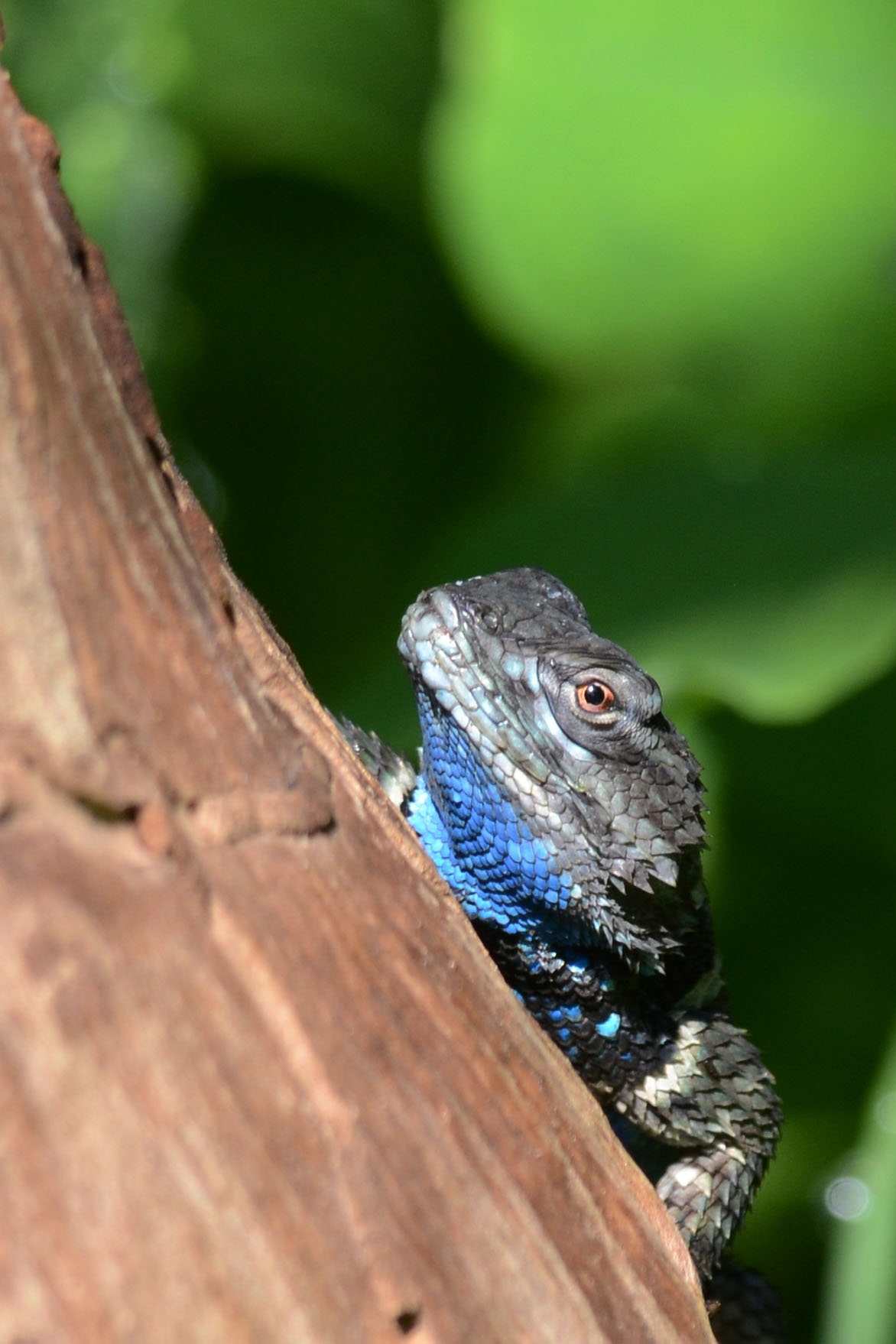

Conservation status
- Least Concern (IUCN 3.1)

Scientific classification
- Kingdom: Animalia
- Phylum: Chordata
- Class: Reptilia
- Order: Squamata
- Suborder: Iguania
- Family: Phrynosomatidae
- Genus: Sceloporus
- Species: S. torquatus

Binomial name
- Sceloporus torquatus Wiegmann, 1828

= Sceloporus torquatus =

Crevice swift

Species of lizard

Sceloporus torquatus, the crevice swift, is a species of lizard in the family Phrynosomatidae. It inhabits the center of Mexico, specifically, the west of the Trans-Mexican Volcanic Belt.

== Naming ==
The subspecies Sceloporus torquatus mikeprestoni was named by Hobart Muir Smith and José Ticul Álvarez in honor of professor emeritus of English, Michael J. Preston.
