= IBM 7950 Harvest =

Cryptanalysis computer

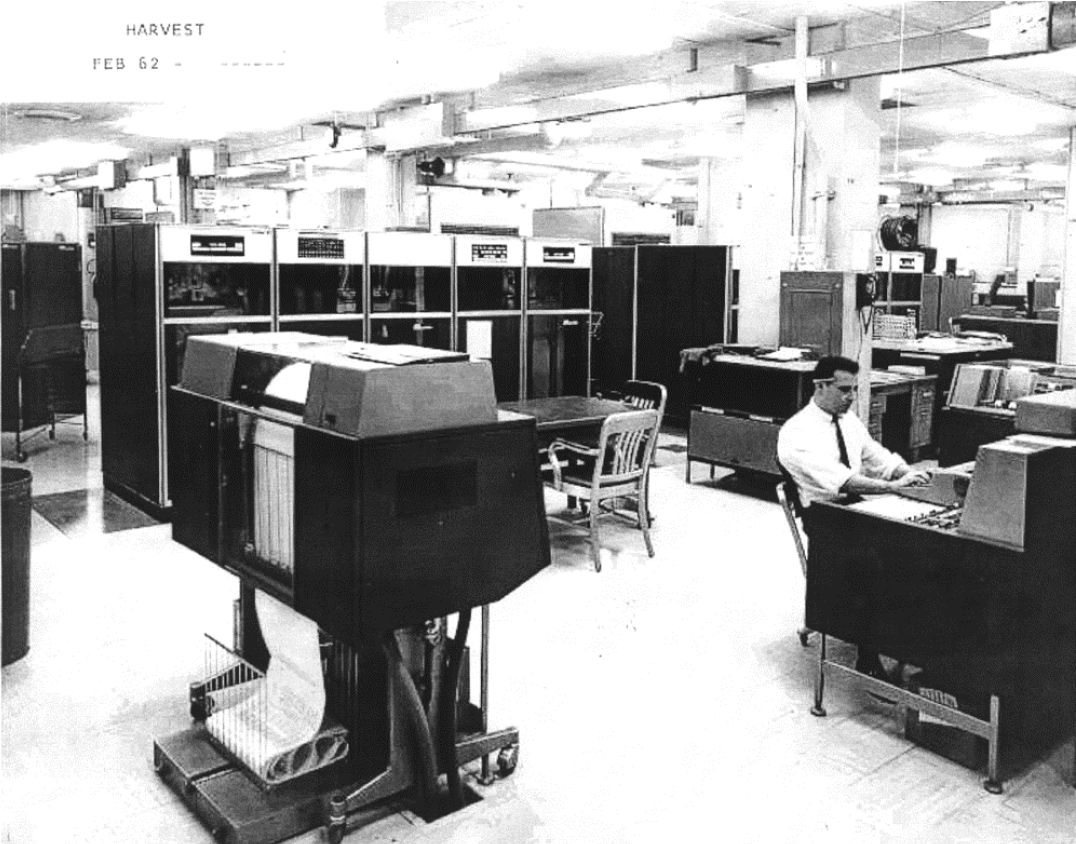
HARVEST

The IBM 7950, also known as Harvest, was a one-of-a-kind adjunct to the Stretch computer designed to be used for cryptanalysis. Built by IBM, it was delivered in 1962 and installed at the United States National Security Agency (NSA). Harvest remained operational and in use until 1976, when it was decommissioned and replaced by a Cray-1 supercomputer.

== Development ==
In April 1958, the final design for the NSA-customized version of IBM's Stretch computer had been approved, and the machine was installed in February 1962. The design engineer was James H. Pomerene, and a key co-architect was Fred Brooks Jr, author of the seminal "Mythical Man-Month." It was built by IBM in Poughkeepsie, New York. Its electronics (fabricated of the same kind of discrete transistors used for Stretch) were physically about twice as big as the Stretch to which it was attached. Harvest added a small number of instructions to Stretch and could not operate independently.

An evaluation conducted by the NSA found that Harvest was more powerful than the best commercially available machine by a factor of 50 to 200, depending on the task.

== Architecture ==
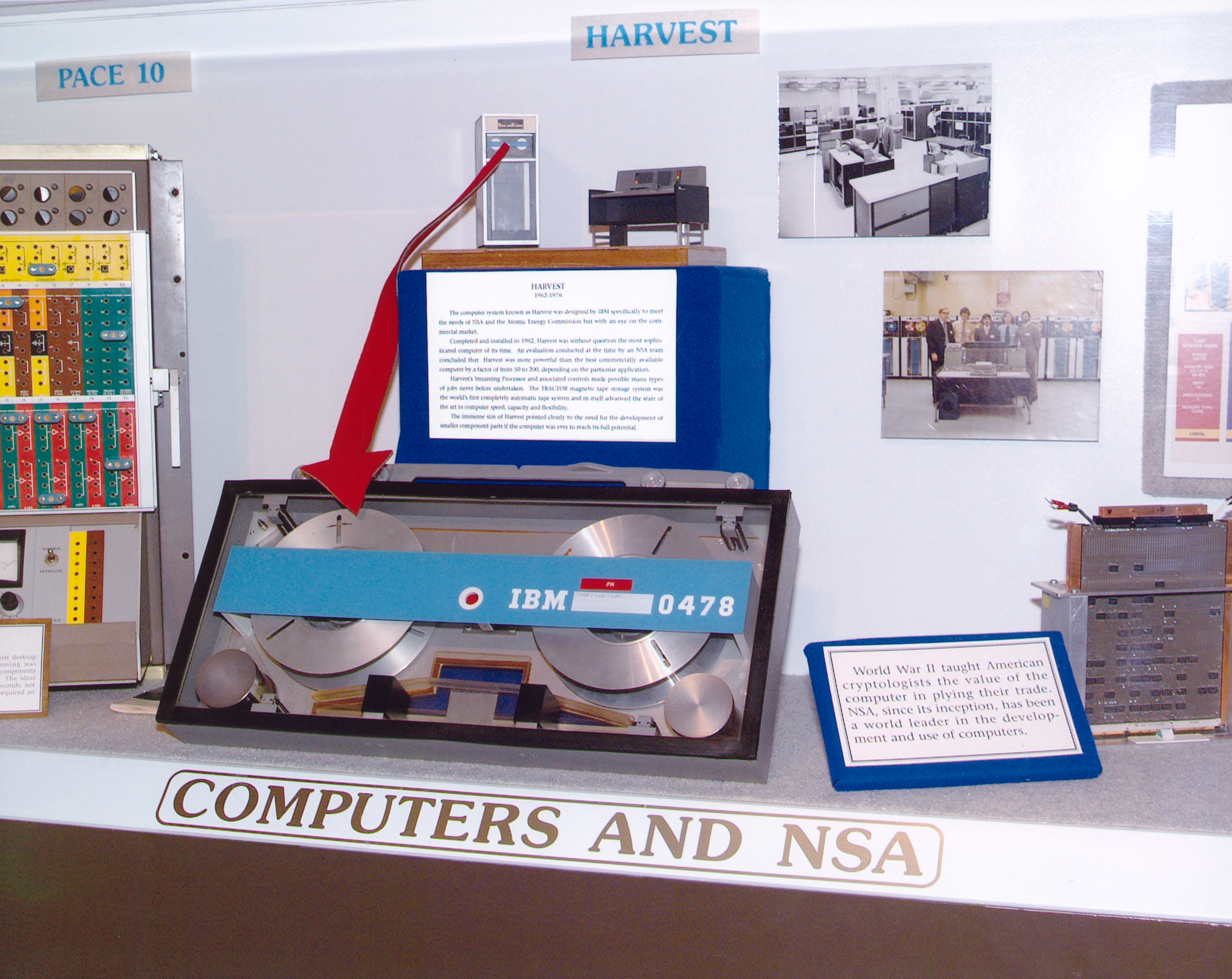
A HARVEST tape cartridge.

The equipment added to the Stretch computer consisted of the following special peripherals:

- IBM 7951 — Stream coprocessor
- IBM 7952 — High-performance core storage
- IBM 7955 — Magnetic tape system, also known as TRACTOR
- IBM 7959 — High-speed I/O exchange
- IBM 7302 — Core Storage Memory Unit

With the stream processing unit, Harvest was able to process 3 million characters a second.

Developed in 1962, the TRACTOR tape system, part of the HARVEST system, was unique for its time and was the world's first automated tape library. It included six tape drives, which handled 1.75-inch-wide (44 mm) tape in dual-reel cartridges, along with a library mechanism that could fetch a cartridge from a library, mount it on a drive, and return it to the library. The transfer rates and library mechanism were balanced in performance such that the system could read two streams of data from tape, and write a third, for the entire capacity of the library, without any time wasted for tape handling.

== Programming ==
Harvest's most important mode of operation was called "setup" mode, in which the processor was configured with several hundred bits of information and the processor then operated by streaming data from memory—possibly taking two streams from memory—and writing a separate stream back to memory. The two streams could be combined, used to find data in tables, or counted to determine the frequency of various values. A value could be anything from one to sixteen contiguous bits, without regard to alignment, and the streams could be as simple as data laid out in memory, or data read repeatedly, under the control of multiple nested "do"-loop descriptors, which were interpreted by the hardware.

Two programming languages, Alpha and Beta (not be confused with Simula-inspired BETA programming language) were designed for programming it, and IBM provided a compiler for the former around the time the machine was delivered.

IBM and the NSA jointly developed Alpha (Advanced Language for Programming Harvest), led in part by computer scientist Frances Allen. Alpha allowed cryptanalysts to rigorously define streaming data operations, statistical analyses, and pattern-matching logic over streams of alphanumeric data. Designed to handle uncertain or incomplete encrypted intercepts, the language introduced specialized syntax including "scab" characters (represented by `?` to denote known but unidentifiable characters) and "pad" characters (blank spaces representing nulls or spacers). Alpha provided a hierarchical structure for organizing text—grouping character strings into "cords" and "ropes"—and allowed users to define custom alphabets for cryptographic processing, anticipating later features of domain-specific dataflow languages.

== Usage ==
One purpose of the machine was to search text for keywords from a watchlist. From a single foreign cipher system, Harvest was able to scan over seven million decrypts for any occurrences of over 7,000 keywords in under four hours.

The computer was also used for codebreaking, and this was enhanced by an early distributed networking system codenamed Rye, which allowed remote access to Harvest. According to a 1965 NSA report, "RYE has made it possible for the agency to locate many more potentially exploitable cryptographic systems and 'bust' situations. Many messages that would have taken hours or days to read by hand methods, if indeed the process were feasible at all, can now be 'set' and machine decrypted in a matter of minutes". Harvest was also used for decipherment of solved systems; the report goes on to say that, "Decrypting a large batch of messages in a solved system [is] also being routinely handled by this system". The Harvest-RYE system became an influential example for computer security; a 1972 review identified NSA’s RYE as one of two “examples of early attempts at achieving ‘multi-level’ security.”

Harvest remained in use until February 27, 1976, having been in operation at the NSA for fourteen years. Part of the reason for its retirement was that a custom mechanical component for the TRACTOR tape library system had worn beyond use, and there was no practical way to replace it because the manufacturer of that part had gone out of business. IBM declined to re-implement the architecture in a more modern technology, and Harvest was ultimately replaced with a Cray-1 supercomputer.

== See also ==
- Cryptanalytic computer
