= DataVault =

Data storage subsystem with redundant hard disk drives

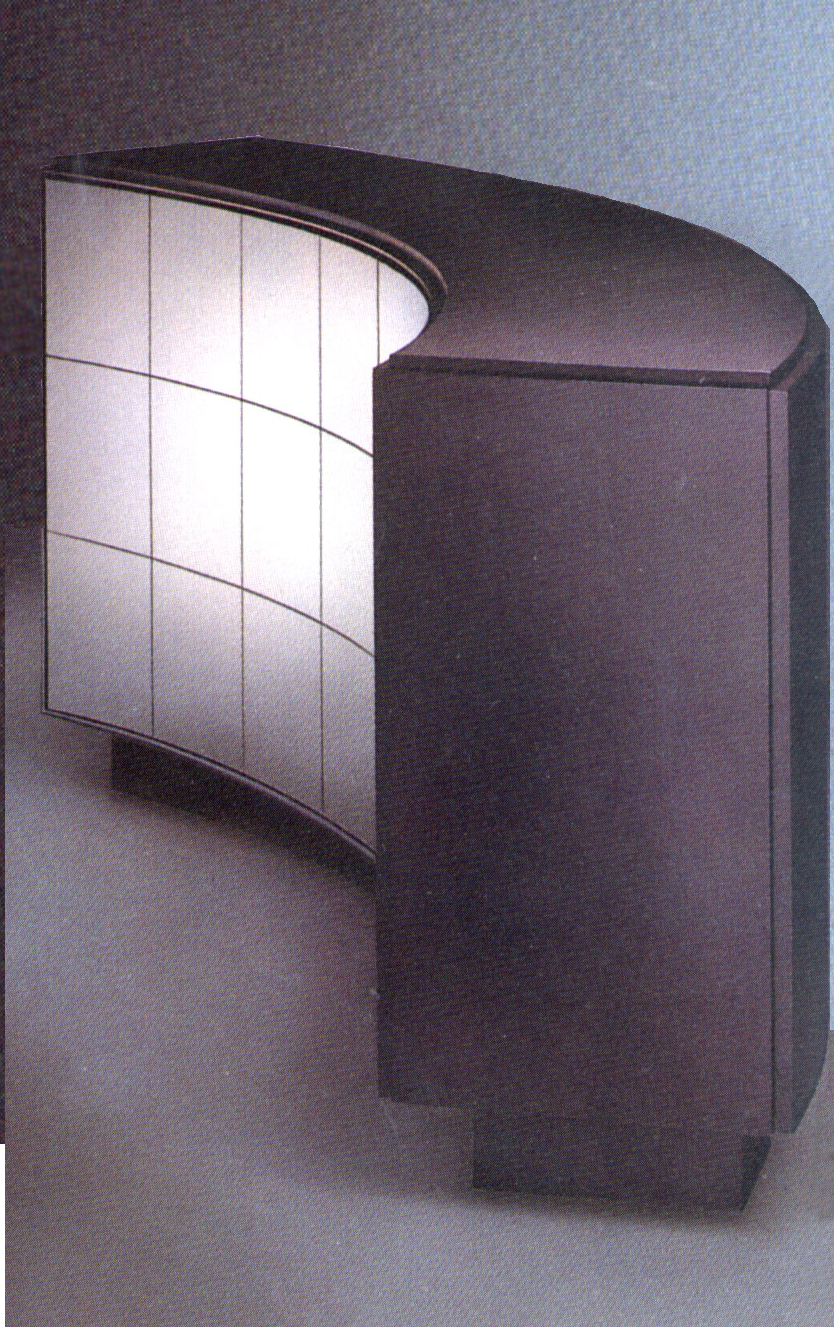
The DataVault cabinet contains 42 disk drives (or 84 for double capacity) plus a minicomputer as the controller The controller accepts I/O commands over an Ethernet connection and transfers data over a high-speed I/O bus

The DataVault was Thinking Machines' mass storage system, storing 5 GB of data, expandable to 10 GB with transfer rates of 40 MB/s. Eight DataVaults could be operated in parallel for a combined data transfer rate of 320 MB/s for up to 80 GB of data.

Each DataVault unit stored its data in an array of 39 individual disk drives with data spread across the drives. Each 64-bit data chunk received from the I/O bus was split into two 32-bit words. Each word was combined with 7 parity bits to form a 39-bit code, split over 39 individual drives. Subsequent failure of any one of the 39 drives would not impair reading of the data, since the ECC code allows any single-bit error to be detected and corrected. The (39,32) code is a SECDED-variant Hamming code, meaning it can detect and correct any single-bit error as well as detect any two-bit error.

Although operation is possible with a single failed drive, three spare drives were available to replace failed units until they are repaired. The ECC codes permit 100% recovery of the data on any one failed disk, allowing a new copy of this data to be reconstructed and written onto the replacement disk. Once this recovery is complete, the data base is considered to be healed.

In today's terminology this would be labeled a RAID-2 subsystem. However, these units shipped before the label RAID was formed.

The DataVault was an example of unusual industrial design. Instead of the usual rectilinear box, the cabinet had a gentle curve that made it look like an information desk or a bartender's station.
