= Ab Initio Software =

American enterprise software corporation

- Company type: Private
- Industry: Enterprise software
- Predecessor: Thinking Machines
- Founded: 1995
- Headquarters: Lexington, Massachusetts, United States of America
- Area served: Worldwide
- Website: www.abinitio.com

Ab Initio Software is an American software corporation based in Lexington, Massachusetts. The company specializes in developing software for managing information processing systems. It was founded in 1995 by the former CEO of Thinking Machines Corporation, Sheryl Handler, and several other former employees after the bankruptcy of that company.
