= Torrent Systems =

- Defunct: 2001
- Fate: Acquired
- Successor: Ascential Software
- Headquarters: Cambridge, MA
- Key people: Edward Zyszkowski Robert Utzschneider
- Products: Orchestrate
- Number of employees: 32

Torrent Systems, originally named Applied Parallel Technologies (APT), was a parallel computing software company founded in 1993 by Edward Zyszkowski, with the first employee being Rob Utzschneider. Torrent received initial funding from the NIST Advanced Technology Program.

== Products ==
The company's product was a parallel flow-based programming system called Orchestrate. The product enabled users to assemble a program using predefined components (called operators) connected by virtual datasets in a manner similar to Unix pipelines. Here is a simple example:

generator
  -records 50
  -schema record (recNum:    int32;
                  firstName: string[max=20];
                  lastName:  string[max=30];)
  |
peek
  -name -all

This script contains two operators: the generator operator (which creates test data) and the peek operator, which displays the contents of the records it receives. The generator will create 50 records, each with three fields; the peek operator will display their contents.

Torrent was acquired by Ascential Software in late 2001 for about $46 million; Orchestrate became part of Ascential's DataStage data integration system, which became part of IBM's Information Server product when Ascential was acquired by IBM in mid-2005. Torrent technology became the Parallel Engine in the Information Server architecture.
