= Mimms Museum of Technology and Art =

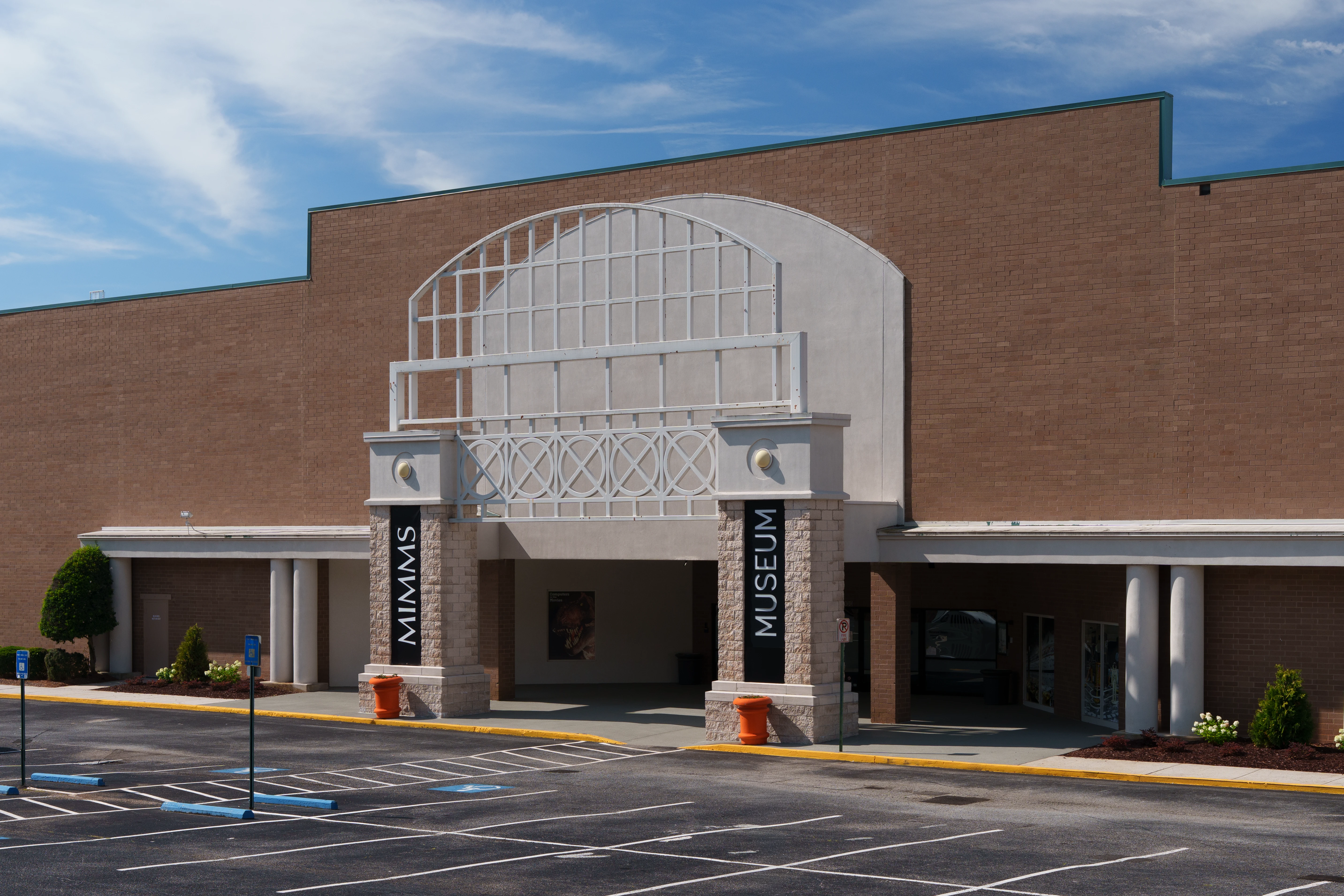
- Front entrance of museum
- Former name: Computer Museum of America (2019-2025)
- Established: July 20, 2019; 7 years ago
- Location: Roswell, Georgia
- Coordinates: 34.038718°N 84.340978°W
- Type: Computer museum
- Website: mimmsmuseum.org

The Mimms Museum of Technology and Art (formerly the Computer Museum of America) is located in Roswell, Georgia and opened in July 2019 to coincide with the fiftieth anniversary of the Apollo 11 moon landing. It is the largest technology museum on the East Coast with the opening of Phase I and when completed will be among the largest in the world.

The museum was founded by Lonnie Mimms, a commercial real estate developer and longtime computing artifact collector, who originally operated an Apple pop up museum. The museum includes rare artifacts including a Cray-1, Apple I, Apple Lisa, a Pixar Image Computer, an Enigma, a Xerox Alto, a MITS Altair 8800 and more. The collection includes the contents of the former Bugbook Historical Computer Museum and the Living Computers: Museum + Labs. While the museum displays many items, they are only a fraction of the over 300,000 in the collection.

In April 2026, the museum opened a permanent exhibition to commemorate Apple's fiftieth anniversary. It is among the largest public collection of Apple products, with over 2,000 artifacts.
