= Michael J. Preston =

American academic

Michael J. Preston is a professor emeritus of English at the University of Colorado Boulder, specializing in Middle English and early Renaissance literature, vernacular culture, folklore and traditional drama.

In 1976, a subspecies of Mexican lizard, Sceloporus torquatus mikeprestoni, was named in his honor by Hobart M. Smith and José Ticul Álvarez.
