= ATW =

ATW may refer to:

== Technology ==
- Accelerator transmutation of waste, a way of processing radioactive waste
- Atari Transputer Workstation, a computer produced in 1980s
- Asynchronous TimeWarp, a technique used in virtual reality headsets

== Entertainment ==
- All Too Well, a song written by American singer-songwriter Taylor Swift and Liz Rose and performed by the former
- Access 31, a former Perth television station with callsign ATW, now replaced by West TV
- Air Transport World, a magazine
- Ansem the Wise, a character from the Kingdom Hearts series
- American Travelways, a fictional airline in the 1986 film The Delta Force
- ATW (album), an album by All Them Witches

== Organizations ==
- American Theatre Wing, a theatre education organization
- Arriva Trains Wales, a former train operating company in the United Kingdom
- Atlantic and Western Railway, in North Carolina, United States

== Places ==
- Agua Tibia Wilderness, a protected area in California
- Appleton International Airport (IATA airport code: ATW), in Appleton, Wisconsin, United States

== Military ==
- Anti-Tank Weapon, a weapon designed to destroy tanks.

== People ==
- Adam the Woo (David Adam Williams, 1974–2025), American YouTuber

== Other ==
- Around the World
- Atsugewi language (ISO 639-3: atw), a language of North America
