= Cd (command) =

Command to change the working directory

cd / chdir
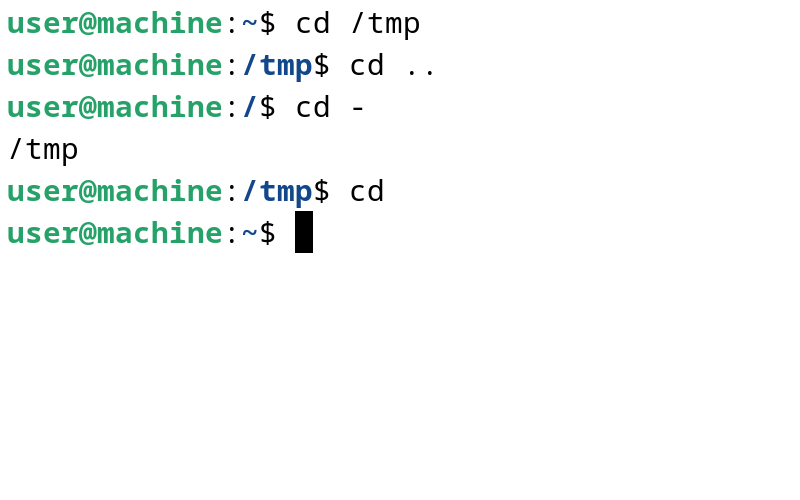
- The cd command illustration (in a shell session in Debian GNU/Linux)
- Developers: AT&T Bell Laboratories, MetaComCo, Microsoft, IBM, DR, Novell, HP, JP Software, ReactOS Contributors
- Operating system: Unix, Unix-like, V, DOS, MSX-DOS, FlexOS, OS/2, TRIPOS, Windows, MPE/iX, Plan 9, Inferno, ReactOS, KolibriOS, SymbOS
- Platform: Cross-platform
- Type: Command

cd is a shell command that changes the working directory. It is available in many shells and other applications that maintain a working directory. In some contexts, the command can perform actions other than change directory. Some environments provide the change directory feature via a different command name such as chdir.

== Implementations ==
Generally, a computer system that provides access to a hierarchical file system, provides a change directory command to set the working directory. As this applies to most operating system shells, most support a change directory command, including Unix and Unix-like (i.e. Linux) shells, and Microsoft shells including Command Prompt and PowerShell.

Other operating systems with shells supporting the command include OS/2, TRIPOS, AmigaOS (where the command is implied for an input path), ReactOS, DOSBox, and UEFI.

- On MS-DOS, the command is available in version 2 and later
- DR DOS 6.0 includes the command as both cd and chdir
- On HP MPE/iX the command is chdir
- On OpenVOS, the command is change_current_dir

Unlike many shell commands that are implemented as separate applications, change directory is often built-in to the shell because it affects the state of the shell whereas other commands modify system state outside the shell. If the command was implemented as a separate application, then the child process would need to modify state in the parent process, but this is often prevented for safety. The command is built-in for most Unix shells (Bourne, tcsh, Bash, etc.), Windows Command Prompt and PowerShell, and MS-DOS COMMAND.COM.

In a shell, the change directory command is typically implemented via a system call which on Unix and Unix-like systems is typically POSIX chdir() and on Windows is in the Windows API.

The command is also provided in many programs other than shells. In the File Transfer Protocol, the control stream command is CWD, but the functionality is available as cd in most command-line clients and some also provide lcd for changing the local working directory vs. the remote setting. The numerical computing environments MATLAB and GNU Octave include a change directory command as cd.

== Use ==
Use of the command varies by context, but there are widespread similarities among variants. The examples below, mostly apply to Unix and Unix-like shells, PowerShell and Command Prompt.

To separate the directory names of a path, a program imposes command-line syntax such as a delimiting text between names – which varies by program. In particular, Unix and Unix-like shells use a forward slash /, Command Prompt uses backslash \ and PowerShell supports either. For simplicity, paths are shown with forward slashes here.

Commonly, a dot is short-hand notation for the working directory and two dots is short-hand for its parent. For example, given working directory /user/bin/tmp, . refers to it and .. refers to /user/bin. The parent notation is often used to form a relative path that specifies a path that is both up and down the hierarchy. For example: starting with /usr/bin/tmp, cd ../../local specifies path /usr/local.

=== Common ===
Features that are commonly found for any change directory command:

- cd path/to/dir For a relative path (no leading slash), the path is appended to the working directory path, moving the context deeper into the directory tree hierarchy; for example, if the working directory is /usr, then cd bin changes the working directory to /usr/bin
- cd /path/to/dir For an absolute path (leading slash), the working directory is replaced with the specified path; for example, cd /bin sets the working directory to /bin
- cd .. Moves the directory tree context up one directory; for example, starting at /usr/bin/tmp, cd .. changes the working directory to /usr/bin
- cd . Does not change the working directory but is useful to recover after a directory is recreated by another process
- cd With no arguments, the command changes the working directory to the user's home directory; exception: Command Prompt reports the working directory path

=== Unix shells ===
Unix-based shells and PowerShell generally share these features:

- cd ~ Changes the working directory to user's home directory
- cd ~username Changes the working directory to the specified user's home directory
- cd - Changes the working directory to the previous directory; for example, starting at /usr/bin/tmp, executing cd /etc followed by cd - returns to /usr/bin/tmp, which enables toggling between two directories without pushd and popd

=== Legacy Microsoft shells ===
DOS maintains separate working directories for each lettered drive, and also has the concept of a current working drive. The cd command can be used to change the working directory of the working drive or another lettered drive. Typing the drive letter as a command on its own changes the working drive, e.g. C:; alternatively, cd with the /d switch may be used to change the working drive and that drive's working directory in one step. Modern versions of Windows simulate this behaviour for backwards compatibility under CMD.EXE.

== Example ==
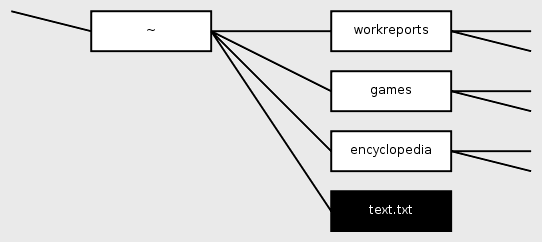
Section of a Unix filesystem showing a user's home directory (represented as ~) with a file and three subdirectories.

Starting with working directory set to the user's home (~), command ls followed by cd games might produce the following:

user@wikipedia:~$ ls
workreports games encyclopedia text.txt
user@wikipedia:~$ cd games
user@wikipedia:~/games$

A similar session in Command Prompt might look like:

C:\> dir
workreports        <DIR>       Wed Oct 9th   9:01
games              <DIR>       Tue Oct 8th  14:32
encyclopedia       <DIR>       Mon Oct 1st  10:05
text        txt           1903 Thu Oct10th  12:43
C:\> cd games
C:\games>

== See also ==
- Directory structure – Hierarchical structure of a computer's file system
- chroot – Shell command and system call that changes the apparent root directory
- List of command-line interpreters
- pushd and popd – Shell commands to save and restore the working directory
- pwd – Shell command that reports the working directory
