= All Over the World =

All Over the World may refer to:

== Albums ==
- All Over the World, a compilation album by Arlo Guthrie, 1991
- All Over the World (JJ Weeks Band album), 2013
- All Over the World (The Seekers album), 1978
- All Over the World, album by The Wailing Souls, 1992
- All Over the World: The Very Best of Electric Light Orchestra, a compilation album, 2005
- "All Over the World" (Electric Light Orchestra song), 1980

== Songs ==
- "All Over the World" (Electric Light Orchestra song), 1980
- "All Over the World" (Françoise Hardy song), 1965
- "All Over the World", a song by Chuck Jackson, 1989
- "All Over the World" (Ola song), 2010
- "All Over the World", a song by Pet Shop Boys from their album Yes, 2009
- "All Over the World", a song by Pixies from their album Bossanova, 1990
- "There's a Kind of Hush (All Over the World)", a song by Geoff Stephens and Les Reed, recorded by Herman's Hermits in 1967 and by The Carpenters in 1976

== See also ==
- All Around the World (disambiguation)
