= Atari Transputer Workstation =

1980s American computer

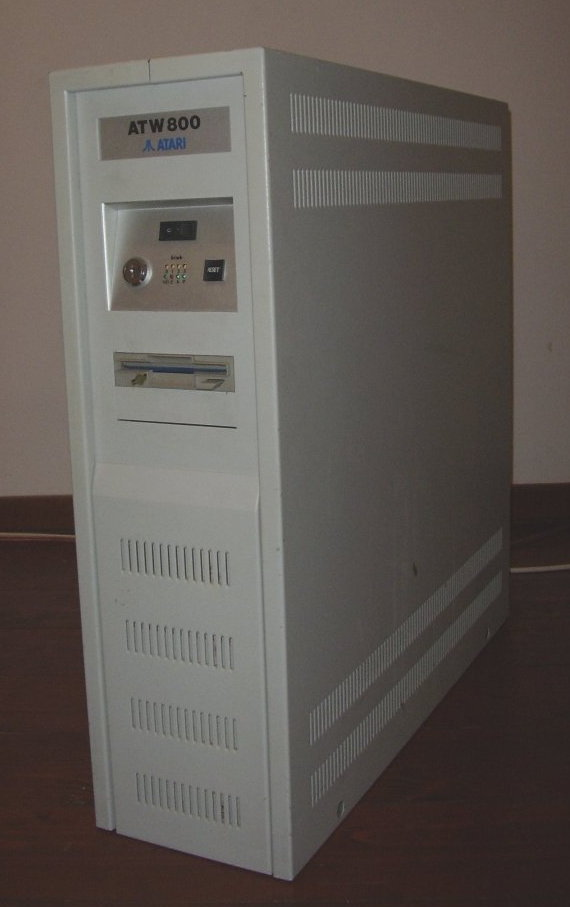
- Front view
- Also known as: ATW-800, ATW, Abaq
- Manufacturer: Atari Corporation
- Type: workstation
- Released: May 1989; 36 years ago
- Discontinued: Yes
- Units shipped: 350
- Operating system: HeliOS
- CPU: 20 MHz T800-20 Transputer
- Memory: 4 MB of RAM (expandable to 16 MB)
- Graphics: Blossom video system with 1 MB of dual-ported RAM
- Input: Complete miniaturized Mega ST acting as an I/O processor with 512 KB RAM

The Atari Transputer Workstation (also known as ATW-800, or simply ATW) is a workstation class computer released by Atari Corporation in the late 1980s, based on the INMOS Transputer. It was introduced in 1987 as the Abaq, but the name was changed before sales began. Sales were almost non-existent, and the product was canceled after only a few hundred units were made.

== History ==
In 1986, Tim King left his job at MetaComCo, along with a few other employees, to start Perihelion Software in England. There they began developing a new parallel-processing operating system named HeliOS. At about the same time, a colleague, Jack Lang, started Perihelion (later Perihelion Hardware) to create a new Transputer-based workstation that would run HeliOS.

While at MetaComCo, much of the Perihelion Software team had worked with both Atari Corp. and Commodore International, producing the programming language ST BASIC for the former, and AmigaDOS for the latter. The principals still had contacts with both companies. Commodore had expressed some interest in their new system, and showed demos of it on an add-on card running inside an Amiga 2000. It appears they later lost interest in it. Atari Corp. met with Perihelion and work began on what would eventually become the Atari Transputer Workstation.

The machine was first introduced at the November 1987 COMDEX with the name Abaq. Two versions were shown at the time; one was a card that connected to the Mega ST bus expansion slot, the second version was a stand-alone tower system containing a miniaturized Mega ST inside. The external card version was dropped at some point during development. It was later learned that the "Abaq" name was in use in Europe, so the product name was changed to ATW800. Perihelion remained the exclusive distributor in England. A first run of prototypes was released in May 1988, followed by a production run in May 1989. In total, only 350 machines were produced (depending on the source either 50 or 100 of the total were prototypes).

The team in charge of the ATW's video system, "Blossom", would later work on another Atari project, the Atari Jaguar video game console.

== Overview ==
System views

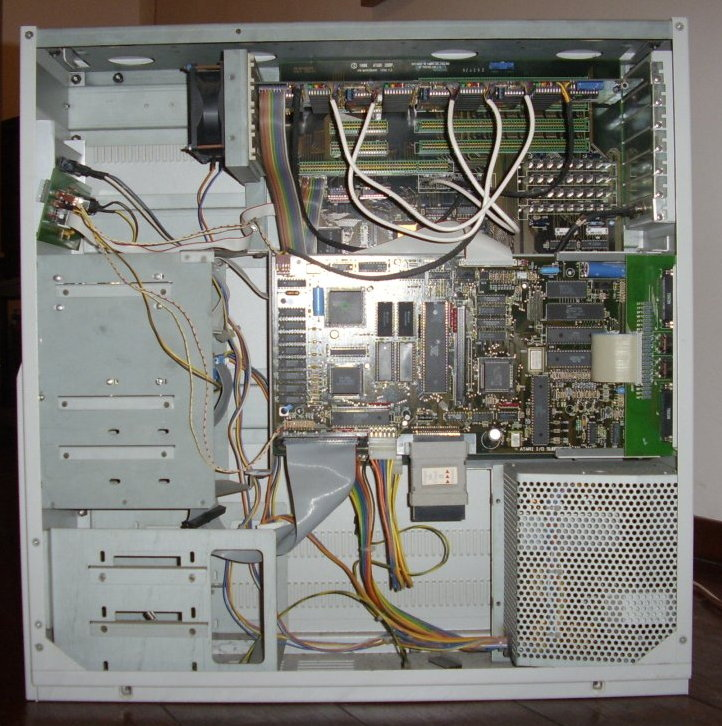
Inside

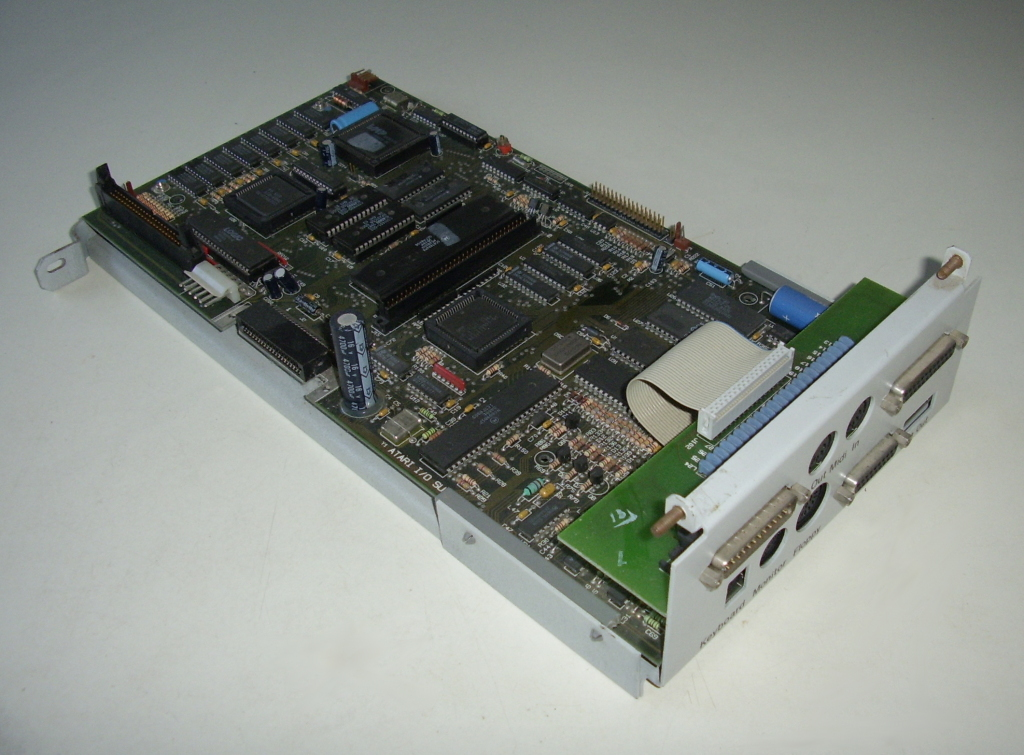
MegaST I/O subsystem

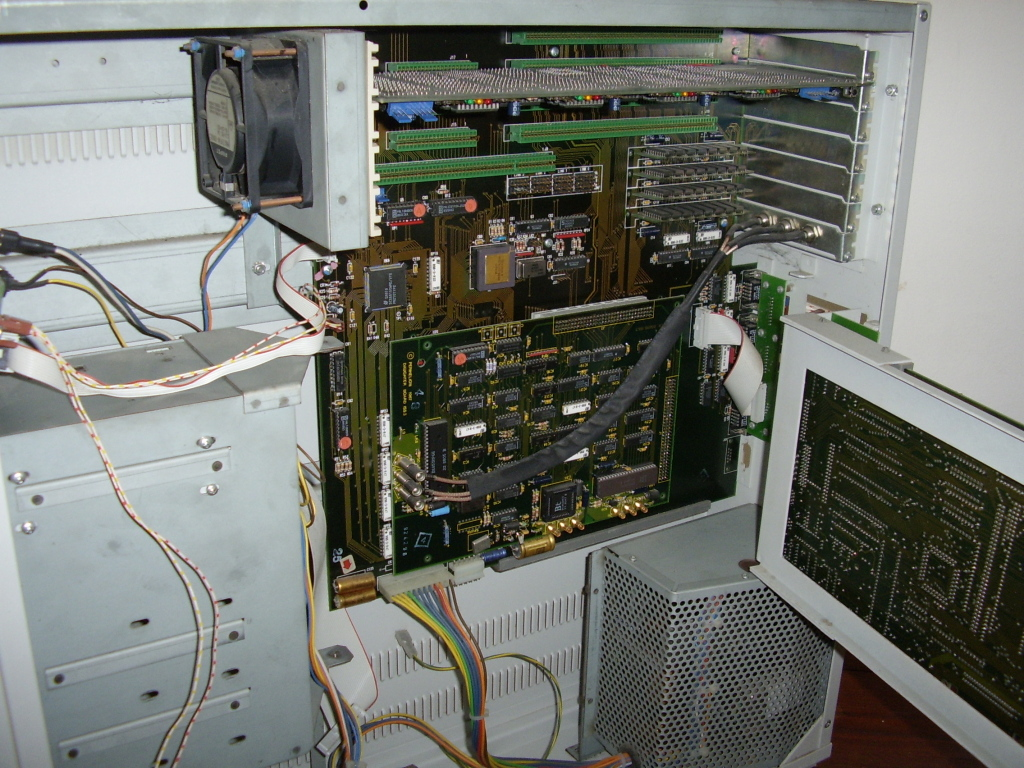
Blossom board

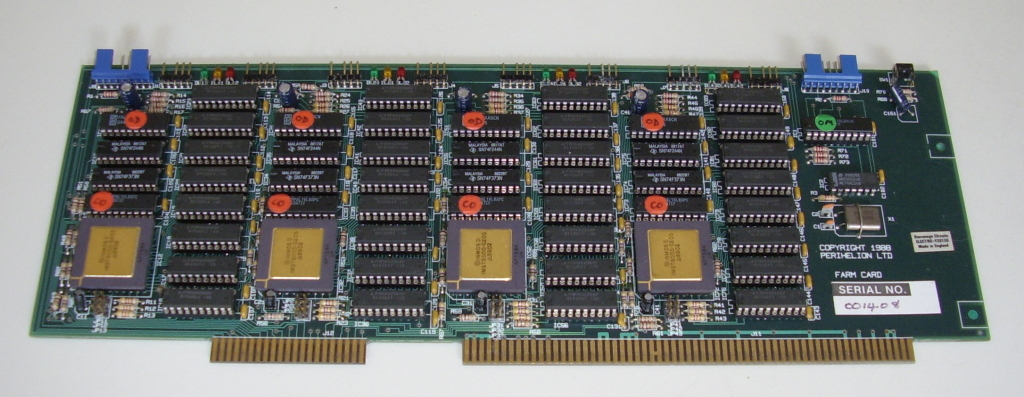
Farmcard

The Atari Transputer Workstation system consists of three main parts:

1. the main motherboard containing a T800-20 Transputer, 4 MB of random-access memory (RAM) (expandable to 16 MB) and 1 MB of dual-ported RAM for the video system.
2. a complete miniaturized Mega ST acting as an input/output (I/O) processor with 512 KB of RAM
3. the Blossom video system board

The host Transputer on the motherboard and I/O system are connected using one of the Transputer's 20 Mbit/s processor links. The motherboard contains three slots for added farm cards containing four Transputers each, meaning that a fully expanded ATW contains 13 Transputers. Each runs at 20 MHz (the -20 in the name) which supplied about 10 MIPS each. The host Transputer's links are also available externally, allowing several ATWs to be connected into one large farm.

HeliOS is Unix-like, but not Unix. It lacks memory protection, due largely to the lack of a memory management unit (MMU) on the Transputer, although a number of measures are employed to reduce the possibility of programs interfering with each other. For example, when invoking a command pipeline, each program is distributed to its own separate processor, communicating with other programs using pipes that are implemented by hardware links. Where many programs may be deployed on the same processor, these processors will not in general be shared by programs belonging to different users.

HeliOS is Unix-like enough that it ran standard Unix utilities, including the X Window System as the machine's graphical user interface (GUI). HeliOS can run on all of the Transputers in a farm concurrently, which allows all computing tasks to be fully distributed. Powering off an ATW does not affect the overall farm, and the tasks simply move to other processors on other systems.

Blossom supports several video modes:

mode 0: 1280 by 960 pixels, 16 colors out of a palette of 4096 (including 16 true grayscales, on a monochrome monitor)
mode 1: 1024 by 768 pixels, 256 colors out of a palette of 16.7 million
mode 2: 640 by 480 pixels (2 virtual screens), 256 colors out of a palette of 16.7 million
mode 3: 512 by 480 pixels, 16.7 million colors

Blossom also includes a number of high-speed effects (128 megapixel fill rates) and blitter functionality, including the ability to apply up to four masks on a bit blit operation in a fashion similar to a modern graphics processing unit's ability to apply several textures to a 3D object.

One oddity of the ATW is that it appears that the Blossom is responsible for the DRAM refresh, although the ATW includes such hardware internally.

The video architecture developed by Perihelion for the ATW formed the basis of a "high resolution video engine" expansion card envisaged for the TT030 workstation, connecting to the machine's VMEbus and supporting direct memory access transfers to and from system RAM.
