= Perihelion Software =

Perihelion Software Limited
- Industry: software
- Founded: 1986
- Founder: Dr. Tim King
- Headquarters: United Kingdom
- Products: HeliOS; Polyhedra

Perihelion Software Limited was a United Kingdom company founded in 1986 by Dr. Tim King along with a number of colleagues who had all worked together at MetaComCo on AmigaOS and written compilers for both the Amiga and the Atari ST.

Perihelion Software produced an operating system for the INMOS Transputer called HeliOS. This was a system that looked like Unix but which could pass messages to processes running on either the same processor or another one. This was used in the Atari Transputer Workstation, among other places.

Later HeliOS was ported to other processors including the ARM architecture.

Perihelion Software also produced an in-memory database system called Polyhedra. The group responsible for this product was set up as a subsidiary, Perihelion Technology Limited (PTL), which did a management buyout in 1994. PTL later changed its name to Polyhedra plc in 1995, and in 2001 was acquired by a Swedish company called ENEA.
