= Polyhedra (software) =

Polyhedra DBMS
- Developer: ENEA AB
- Release: 30 June 1993; 32 years ago
- Stable release: 9.7 / 17 December 2021; 4 years ago
- Operating system: Linux, Windows, Solaris, VxWorks, LynxOS, Integrity, OSE
- Type: in-memory RDBMS; flash-based RDBMS
- License: Proprietary, with Polyhedra Lite available as Freeware
- Website: enea.com/polyhedra

Polyhedra is a family of relational database management systems offered by ENEA AB, a Swedish company. The original version of Polyhedra (now referred to as Polyhedra IMDB) was an in-memory database management system which could be used in high availability configurations; in 2006 Polyhedra Flash DBMS was introduced to allow databases to be stored in flash memory. All versions employ the client–server model to ensure the data are protected from misbehaving application software, and they use the same SQL, ODBC and type-4 JDBC interfaces. Polyhedra is targeted primarily for embedded use by original equipment manufacturers (OEMs), and big-name customers include Ericsson, ABB, Emerson, Lockheed Martin, United Utilities and Siemens AG.

== Company ==
Polyhedra development was started in 1991 by Perihelion Technology Ltd, a subsidiary of Perihelion Software Ltd (PSL); initially, the project had a working title the "Perihelion Application Toolkit", but was soon renamed Polyhedra (using a left-over trademark from another PSL project). There was a management buyout of PTL in 1994, and the company name changed to Polyhedra plc to match the name of the product. Polyhedra plc was in turn acquired by Enea AB in 2001.

== Features ==
Tim King, the founder of Perihelion Software Ltd, developed a relational DBMS for historical data as part of his PhD work; Dave Stoneham, who set up PTL, had previously developed a SCADA system. Building on these experiences, Polyhedra was originally developed "to bring the benefits of relational technology to the embedded market". To this end, it had to be small footprint, very fast... and it had to avoid the need for polling, which is a performance killer. Consequently, it was designed from the start to:

- keep the working copy of the data in-memory (though there is now a variant that keeps the data in a flash-based file);
- use a client–server architecture to protect the data from corruption by rogue application code;
- have an 'active query' mechanism to update client applications when relevant database changes occur;
- have a very simple processing model where a transaction is either a schema change, a query, or a request for a set of inserts, updates and/or deletes - such alterations can either be expressed via SQL statements or by updating through the active queries with (in conjunction with active queries) an optimistic concurrency mechanism to handle clashing updates;
- have a table inheritance mechanism which, when combined with Database triggers (via the CL language, see below), allows the database designer to program the database in an object-oriented fashion. Table inheritance also avoids or reduces the need for supplementary tables whose primary key is a foreign key to another table, and thus can simplify many queries and updates.
- have a Historian module to allow large volumes of times-series data to be captured, stored, archived and queried in an efficient fashion.

Polyhedra IMDB achieves data persistence through the use of snapshots and journal logging; Polyhedra Flash DBMS uses shadow paging, with 2 levels of recursion. In addition, Polyhedra can be used in hot-standby configurations for improved availability. The transactional model used by all Polyhedra products ensures atomicity, consistency and isolation (as defined by the ACID properties); durability is enforced in Polyhedra Flash DBMS, while in Polyhedra IMDB clients can choose the durability model when they issue their transactions.

"The Polyhedra DBMS system is fundamentally different compared to other relational systems, because of its active behaviour. This is achieved through two mechanisms, active queries and by the control language (CL). An active query looks quite like a normal query where some data is retrieved and/or written, but instead the query stays in the database until explicitly aborted. When a change in the data occurs that would alter the result of the query, the application is notified. The CL, which is a fully object-oriented script language that supports encapsulation, information hiding and inheritance, can determine the behaviour of data in the database. This means that methods, private or public, can be associated with data performing operations on them without involving the application."

Polyhedra is not a general-purpose DBMS, as the restricted transactional model does not meet all needs, and its fault-tolerance model is based on the hot-standby approach (to minimise hardware costs) rather than clustering (which is better for load-sharing). However, its limitations are benefits in embedded use, where the emphasis in a deployed application is on performance and cost rather than handling continually varying usage patterns.

Most of the Polyhedra products are made available for purchase under a proprietary license, but in 2012 Enea released Polyhedra Lite under a freeware license.

== Release history ==
- 1991 Development started.
- 1993 Polyhedra 1.0: first commercial release of an in-memory Relational DBMS (RDBMS).
- 1995 Ported to Windows and Linux.
- 1996 Polyhedra 2.0: added hot standby configurations for use in applications needing high availability. First port to an RTOS (pSOS)
- 1997 Polyhedra 3.0: new in-memory data storage engine, for improved space and time efficiency.
- 1999 Polyhedra 3.1: adds new data types, ODBC API. OSE port.
- 2001 Polyhedra 4.0: JDBC support, additional index type, read-only replicas, multi-threading.
- 2002 Polyhedra 4.1: client–server comms overhauled for substantial performance improvements, especially for client apps using the ODBC API (now deemed the 'native' API for all platforms).
- 2003 Polyhedra 5.0: UNICODE, schema migration (SQL 'ALTER TABLE').
- 2004 Polyhedra 6.0: 64-bit support re-introduced, for Linux and Solaris. (It previously had been available on DEC Alpha under Digital UNIX until usage of that platform generally died out.) Polyhedra64 has subsequently been ported to Windows x64.
- 2006 Polyhedra Flash DBMS introduced, based on a fork of the Polyhedra IMDB code base.
- 2007 Polyhedra 7.0: Polyhedra IMDB and Polyhedra Flash DBMS code bases unified, for ease of support and greater commonality of features. Also, enhanced resource management and multi-threading.
- 2008 Polyhedra 8.0: Polyhedra Flash DBMS now supports hot standby configurations for use in applications needing high availability, in a similar way to Polyhedra IMDB. Polyhedra 8.1 added Linux/MIPS support, the ability to monitor active queries, and enhancements to the historian.
- 2009 Polyhedra 8.2: Linux ODBC drivers and IPv6
- 2010

- Polyhedra 8.3: Some SQL enhancements and streaming output from historian.
- Polyhedra 8.4: performance enhancements

- 2011 Polyhedra 8.5: better integration with 3rd-party tools, and improved performance on Windows. Replica servers can be used in a fan-out configuration for better scaling.
- 2012 Polyhedra 8.6: 64-bit integer data type. Polyhedra Lite introduced: a free-to-use, reduced-functionality version of Polyhedra32 IMDB, available for Windows, and for Linux on x86 and the Raspberry Pi.
- 2013

- Polyhedra 8.7: locking and cascaded deletes.
- Polyhedra 8.8: encrypted communications

- 2014 Polyhedra 8.9: SQL enhancements (GROUP BY and HAVING, DISTINCT, outer joins), security enhancements, and online backups for time-series data.
- 2015 Polyhedra 9.0: read-only partial database replication via a subscription mechanism, an ADO.NET data provider for Polyhedra, and enhancements to the proprietary 'callback API' that can yield significant performance enhancements.
- 2016 Polyhedra 9.1: bi-directional subscription and partial table replication, internal resource monitoring, and a Python DB-API module with extensions for Polyhedra-specific features such as active queries.
- 2017

- Polyhedra 9.2: reduced memory usage, RDI (Remove Device Interface) API, OPC UA RDI, and SQL EXPLAIN command.
- Polyhedra 9.3: server initiated replication.

- 2018 Polyhedra 9.4: Embedded database API and limited SQL function-based indexes.
- 2019 Polyhedra 9.5: Backup standby, MQTT interface and Grafana interface.
- 2020 Polyhedra 9.6: REST API, WebSocket Server and IMDB API Enhancements.
- 2021 Polyhedra 9.7: IMDB API BLOB caching, multiple database support.
- 2022 Polyhedra 9.8: Maintenance release, updates for supported OS versions.
- 2023 Polyhedra 9.9: Maintenance release, updates for supported OS versions.
- 2024 Polyhedra 9.10: Maintenance release, updates for supported OS versions.
- 2025 Polyhedra 9.11: Support for User mode Linx interprocess communication, updates for supported OS versions.
