= Transputer =

Series of pioneering microprocessors from the 1980s

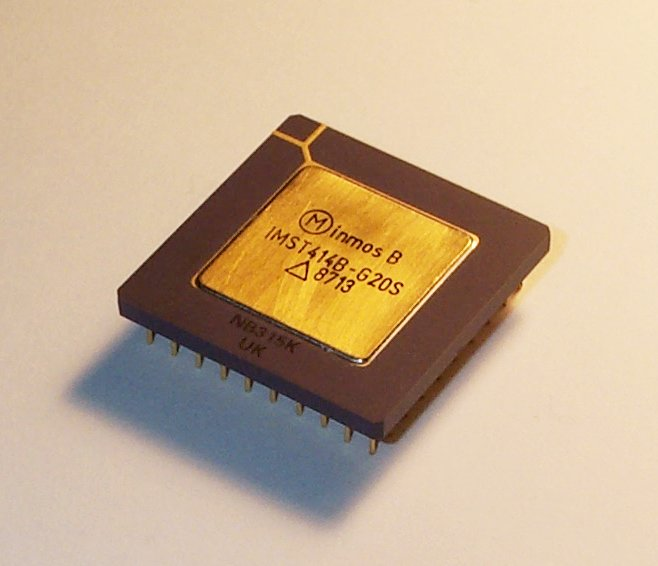
T414 transputer chip

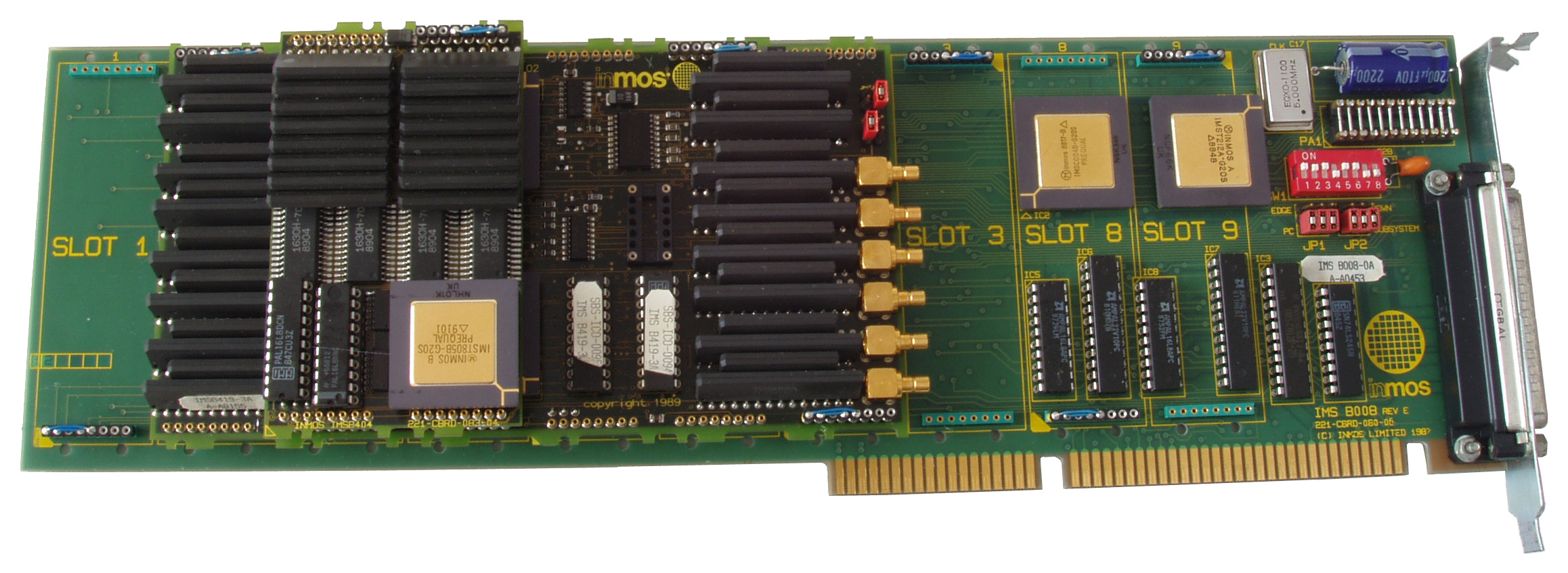
IMSB008 base platform with IMSB419 and IMSB404 modules mounted

The transputer is a series of microprocessors from the 1980s, intended for parallel computing. To support this, each transputer had its own integrated memory and serial communication links to exchange data with other transputers. They were designed and produced by Inmos, a semiconductor company based in Bristol, United Kingdom.

For some time in the late 1980s, many considered the transputer to be the next great design for the future of computing. While the transputer did not achieve this expectation, the transputer architecture was highly influential in provoking new ideas in computer architecture, several of which have re-emerged in different forms in modern systems.

== Background ==
In the early 1980s, conventional central processing units (CPUs) appeared to have reached a performance limit. Up to that time, manufacturing difficulties limited the amount of circuitry that could fit on a chip. Continued improvements in the fabrication process had largely removed this restriction. Within a decade, chips could hold more circuitry than the designers knew how to use. Traditional complex instruction set computer (CISC) designs were reaching a performance plateau, and it wasn't clear it could be overcome.

It seemed that the only way forward was to increase the use of parallelism, the use of several CPUs that would work together to solve several tasks at the same time. This depended on such machines being able to run several tasks at once, a process termed multitasking. This had generally been too difficult for prior microprocessor designs to handle, but more recent designs were able to accomplish it effectively. It was clear that in the future, this would be a feature of all operating systems (OSs).

A side effect of most multitasking design is that it often also allows the processes to be run on physically different CPUs, in which case it is termed multiprocessing. A low-cost CPU built for multiprocessing could allow the speed of a machine to be raised by adding more CPUs, potentially far more cheaply than by using one faster CPU design.

The first transputer designs were due to computer scientist David May and telecommunications consultant Robert Milne. In 1990, May received an Honorary DSc from University of Southampton, followed in 1991 by his election as a Fellow of The Royal Society and the award of the Patterson Medal of the Institute of Physics in 1992. Tony Fuge, then a leading engineer at Inmos, was awarded the Prince Philip Designers Prize in 1987 for his work on the T414 transputer.

== Design ==
The transputer was the first general purpose microprocessor designed specifically to be used in parallel computing systems. The goal was to produce a family of chips ranging in power and cost that could be wired together to form a complete parallel computer. The name, from "transistor" and "computer", was selected to indicate the role the individual transputers would play: numbers of them would be used as basic building blocks in a larger integrated system, just as transistors had been used in earlier designs.

Originally the plan was to make the transputer cost only a few dollars per unit. Inmos saw them being used for practically everything, from operating as the main CPU for a computer to acting as a channel controller for disk drives in the same machine. In a traditional machine, the processing capability of a disk controller, for instance, would be idle when the disk was not being accessed. In contrast, in a transputer system, spare cycles on any of these transputers could be used for other tasks, greatly increasing the overall performance of the machines.

The transputer had large on-chip memory, making it essentially a processor-in-memory. Even one transputer would have all the circuitry needed to work by itself, a feature more commonly associated with microcontrollers. The intent was to allow transputers to be connected together as easily as possible, with no need for a complex bus, or motherboard. Power and a simple clock signal had to be supplied, but little else: random-access memory (RAM), a RAM controller, bus support and even a real-time operating system (RTOS) were all built in. In this way, the last of the transputers were single Reusable Micro Cores (RMC) in the then emerging SoC market.

=== Architecture ===
The original transputer used a very simple and rather unusual architecture to achieve a high performance in a small area. It used microcode as the main method to control the data path, but unlike other designs of the time, many instructions took only one cycle to execute. Instruction opcodes were used as the entry points to the microcode read-only memory (ROM) and the outputs from the ROM were fed directly to the data path. For multi-cycle instructions, while the data path was performing the first cycle, the microcode decoded four possible options for the second cycle. The decision as to which of these options would actually be used could be made near the end of the first cycle. This allowed for very fast operation while keeping the architecture generic.

The clock rate of 20 MHz was quite high for the era and the designers were very concerned about the practicality of distributing such a fast clock signal on a board. A slower external clock of 5 MHz was used, and this was multiplied up to the needed internal frequency using a phase-locked loop (PLL). The internal clock actually had four non-overlapping phases and designers were free to use whichever combination of these they wanted, so it could be argued that the transputer actually ran at 80 MHz. Dynamic logic was used in many parts of the design to reduce area and increase speed. Unfortunately, these methods are difficult to combine with automatic test pattern generation scan testing so they fell out of favour for later designs.

Prentice-Hall published a book on the general principles of the transputer.

=== Links ===
The basic design of the transputer included serial links known as "os-link"s that allowed it to communicate with up to four other transputers, each at 5, 10, or 20 Mbit/s – which was very fast for the 1980s. Any number of transputers could be connected together over links (which could run tens of metres over differential wiring) to form one computing farm. A hypothetical desktop machine might have two of the "low end" transputers handling input/output (I/O) tasks on some of their serial lines (hooked up to appropriate hardware) while they talked to one of their larger cousins acting as a CPU on another.

There were limits to the size of a system that could be built in this fashion. Since each transputer was linked to another in a fixed point-to-point layout, sending messages to a more distant transputer required that messages be relayed by each chip in the line. This introduced a delay with every "hop" over a link, leading to long delays on large nets. To solve this problem Inmos also provided a zero-delay switch that connected up to 32 transputers (or switches) into even larger networks.

=== Booting ===
Transputers could boot from memory, as is the case for most computers, but could also be booted over its network links. A special pin on the chips, BootFromROM, indicated which method it should use. If BootFromROM was asserted when the chip was reset, it would begin processing at the instruction two bytes from the top of memory, which was normally used to perform a backward jump into the boot code. If this pin was not asserted, the chip would instead wait for bytes to be received on any network link. The first byte to be received was the length of the code to follow. Following bytes were copied into low memory and then jumped into once that number of bytes had been received.

The general concept for the system was to have one transputer act as the central authority for booting a system containing a number of connected transputers. The selected transputer would have the BootFromROM permanently asserted, which would cause it to begin running a booter process from ROM on startup. The other transputers would have the BootFromROM tied low, and would simply wait. The loader would boot the central transputer, which would then begin sending boot code to the other transputers in the network, and could customize the code sent to each one, for instance, sending a device driver to the transputer connected to the hard drives.

The system also included the 'special' code lengths of 0 and 1 which were reserved for PEEK and POKE. This allowed inspection and changing of RAM in an unbooted transputer. After a peek, followed by a memory address, or a poke, with an address and single word of data, the transputer would return to waiting for a bootstrap. This mechanism was generally used for debugging.

=== Scheduler ===
Added circuitry scheduled traffic over the links. Processes waiting for communications would automatically pause while the networking circuitry finished its reads or writes. Other processes running on the transputer would then be given that processing time. It included two priority levels to improve real-time and multiprocessor operation. The same logical system was used to communicate between programs running on one transputer, implemented as virtual network links in memory. So programs asking for any input or output automatically paused while the operation completed, a task that normally required an operating system to handle as the arbiter of hardware. Operating systems on the transputer did not need to handle scheduling; the chip could be considered to have an OS inside it.

=== Instruction set ===
To include all this function on one chip, the transputer's core logic was simpler than most CPUs. While some have called it reduced instruction set computer (RISC) due to its rather sparse nature, and because that was then a desirable marketing buzzword, it was heavily microcoded, had a limited register set, and complex memory-to-memory instructions, all of which place it firmly in the CISC camp. Unlike register-heavy load/store RISC CPUs, the transputer had only three data registers, which behaved as a stack. In addition a workspace pointer pointed to a conventional memory stack, easily accessible via the instructions Load Local and Store Local. This allowed for very fast context switching by simply changing the workspace pointer to the memory used by another process (a method used in a number of contemporary designs, such as the TI-990) series. The three register stack contents were not preserved past certain instructions, like Jump, when the transputer could do a context switch.

The transputer instruction set consisted of 8-bit instructions assembled from opcode and operand nibbles. The upper nibble contained the 16 possible primary instruction codes, making it one of the very few commercialized minimal instruction set computers. The lower nibble contained the one immediate constant operand, commonly used as an offset relative to the workspace (memory stack) pointer. Two prefix instructions allowed construction of larger constants by prepending their lower nibbles to the operands of following instructions. Further instructions were supported via the instruction code Operate (Opr), which decoded the constant operand as an extended zero-operand opcode, providing for almost endless and easy instruction set expansion as newer implementations of the transputer were introduced.

The 16 'primary' one-operand instructions were:

Mnemonic	Description
J	Jump – add immediate operand to instruction pointer
LDLP	Load local pointer – load a workspace-relative pointer onto the top of the register stack
PFIX	Prefix – general way to increase lower nibble of following primary instruction
LDNL	Load non-local – load a value offset from address at top of stack
LDC	Load constant – load constant operand onto the top of the register stack
LDNLP	Load non-local pointer – load address, offset from top of stack
NFIX	Negative prefix – general way to negate (and possibly increase) lower nibble
LDL	Load local – load value offset from workspace
ADC	Add constant – add constant operand to top of register stack
CALL	Subroutine call – push instruction pointer and jump
CJ	Conditional jump – depending on value at top of register stack
AJW	Adjust workspace – add operand to workspace pointer
EQC	Equals constant – test if top of register stack equals constant operand
STL	Store local – store at constant offset from workspace
STNL	Store non-local – store at address offset from top of stack
OPR	Operate – general way to extend instruction set

All these instructions take a constant, representing an offset or an arithmetic constant. If this constant was less than 16, all these instructions coded to one byte.

The first 16 'secondary' zero-operand instructions (using the OPR primary instruction) were:

Mnemonic	Description
REV	Reverse – swap two top items of register stack
LB	Load byte
BSUB	Byte subscript
ENDP	End process
DIFF	Difference
ADD	Add
GCALL	General call – swap top of stack and instruction pointer
IN	Input – receive message
PROD	Product
GT	Greater than – the only comparison instruction
WSUB	Word subscript
OUT	Output – send message
SUB	Subtract
STARTP	Start process
OUTBYTE	Output byte – send one-byte message
OUTWORD	Output word – send one-word message

=== Development ===
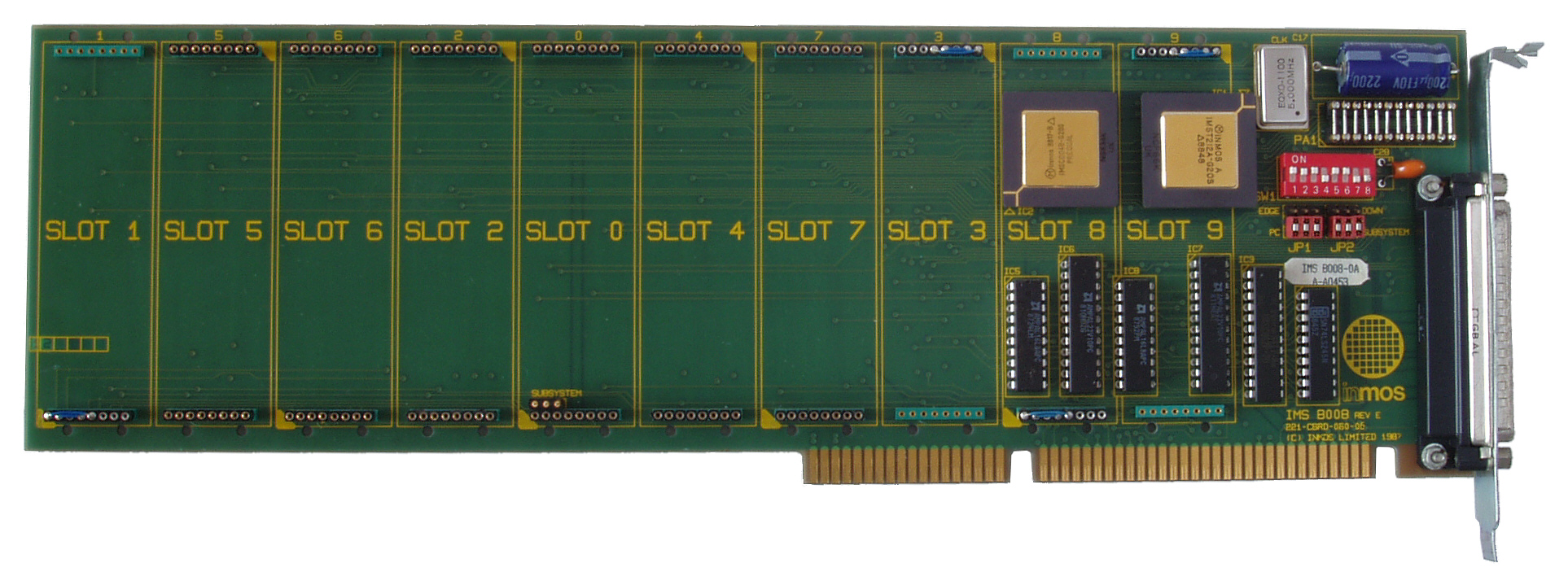
Empty B008 motherboard

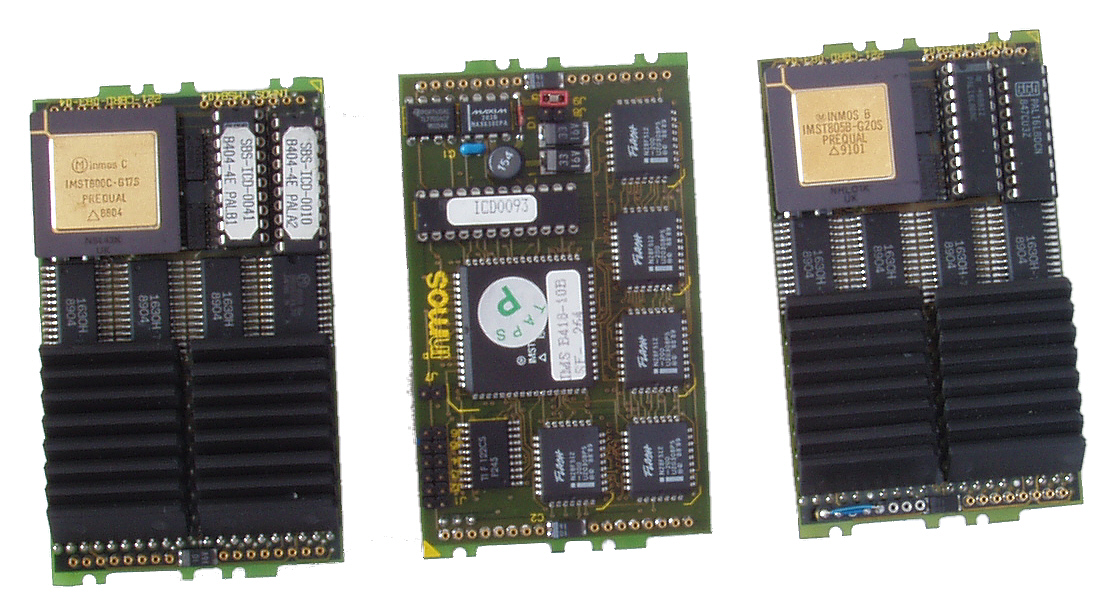
Selection of TRAMs

To provide an easy means of prototyping, constructing and configuring multiple-transputer systems, Inmos introduced the TRAM (TRAnsputer Module) standard in 1987. A TRAM was essentially a building block daughterboard comprising a transputer and, optionally, external memory and/or peripheral devices, with simple standardised connectors providing power, transputer links, clock and system signals. Various sizes of TRAM were defined, from the basic Size 1 TRAM (3.66 in by 1.05 in) up to Size 8 (3.66 in by 8.75 in). Inmos produced a range of TRAM motherboards for various host buses such as Industry Standard Architecture (ISA), MicroChannel, or VMEbus. TRAM links operate at 10 Mbit/s or 20 Mbit/s.

== Software ==
Transputers were intended to be programmed using the programming language occam, based on the communicating sequential processes (CSP) process calculus. The transputer was built to run occam specifically, more than contemporary CISC designs were built to run languages like Pascal or C. Occam supported concurrency and channel-based inter-process or inter-processor communication as a fundamental part of the language. With the parallelism and communications built into the chip and the language interacting with it directly, writing code for things like device controllers became a triviality; even the most basic code could watch the serial ports for I/O, and would automatically sleep when there was no data.

The initial Occam development environment for the transputer was the Inmos D700 Transputer Development System (TDS). This was an unorthodox integrated development environment incorporating an editor, compiler, linker and (post-mortem) debugger. The TDS was a transputer application written in Occam. The TDS text editor was notable in that it was a folding editor, allowing blocks of code to be hidden and revealed, to make the structure of the code more apparent. Unfortunately, the combination of an unfamiliar programming language and equally unfamiliar development environment did nothing for the early popularity of the transputer. Later, Inmos would release more conventional Occam cross-compilers, the Occam 2 Toolsets.

Implementations of more mainstream programming languages, such as C, FORTRAN, Ada, Forth, and Pascal were also later released by both Inmos and third-party vendors. These usually included language extensions or libraries providing, in a less elegant way, Occam-like concurrency and channel-based communication.

The transputer's lack of support for virtual memory inhibited the porting of mainstream variants of the Unix operating system, though ports of Unix-like operating systems (such as Minix and Idris from Whitesmiths) were produced. An advanced Unix-like distributed operating system, Helios, was also designed specifically for multi-transputer systems by Perihelion Software.

== Implementations ==
The first transputers were announced in 1983 and released in 1984.

In keeping with their role as microcontroller-like devices, they included on-board RAM and a built-in RAM controller which enabled more memory to be added with no added hardware. Unlike other designs, transputers did not include I/O lines: these were to be added with hardware attached to the existing serial links. There was one 'Event' line, similar to a conventional processor's interrupt line. Treated as a channel, a program could 'input' from the event channel, and proceed only after the event line was asserted.

All transputers ran from an external 5 MHz clock input; this was multiplied to provide the processor clock.

The transputer did not include a memory management unit (MMU) or a virtual memory system.

Transputer variants (except the cancelled T9000) can be categorised into three groups: the 16-bit T2 series, the 32-bit T4 series, and the 32-bit T8 series with 64-bit IEEE 754 floating-point support.

=== T2: 16-bit ===
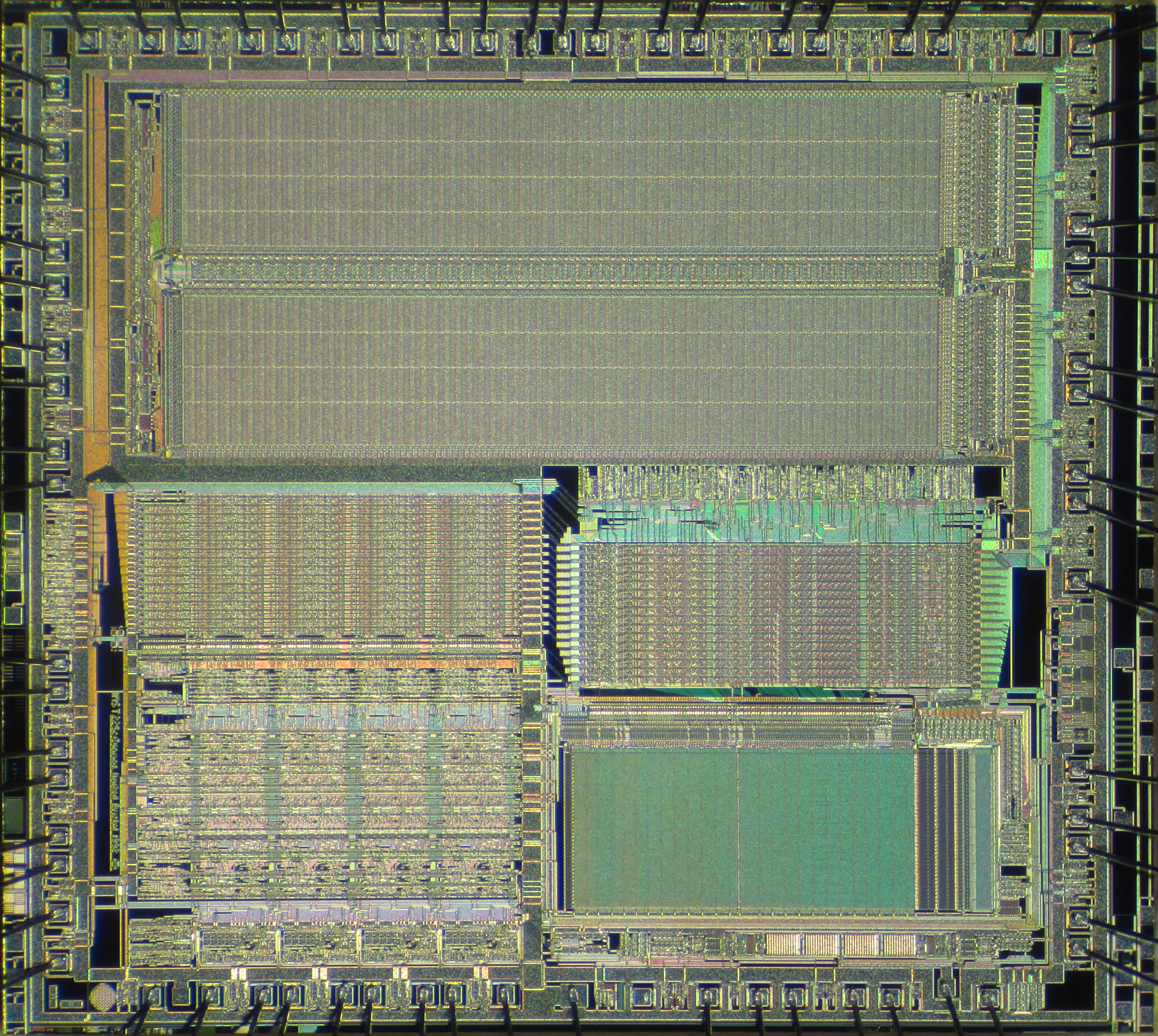
Inmos T225 die

The prototype 16-bit transputer was the S43, which lacked the scheduler and DMA-controlled block transfer on the links. At launch, the T212 and M212 (the latter with an on-board disk controller) were the 16-bit offerings. The T212 was available in 17.5 and 20 MHz processor clock speed ratings. The T212 was superseded by the T222, with on-chip RAM expanded from 2 KB to 4 KB, and, later, the T225. This added debugging-breakpoint support (by extending the instruction "J 0") plus some extra instructions from the T800 instruction set. Both the T222 and T225 ran at 20 MHz.

=== T4: 32-bit ===
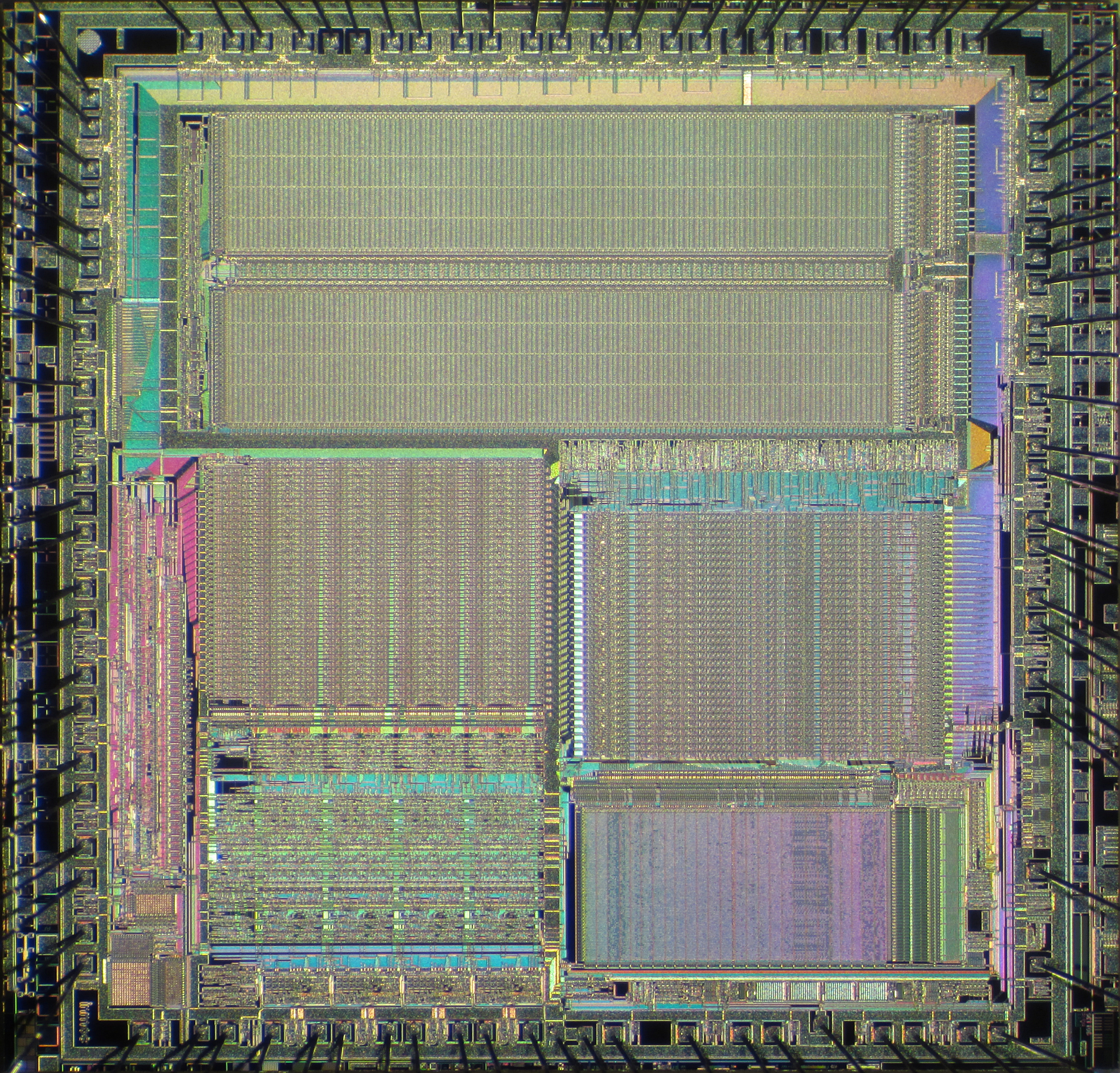
Inmos T425 die

Launched in October 1985, the T414 employed the equivalent of 900,000 transistors and was fabricated with a 1.5 micrometre feature size. It was a 32-bit design, able to process 32-bit units of data and to address up to 4 GB of main memory. Originally, the first 32-bit variant was to be the T424, but fabrication difficulties meant that this was redesigned as the T414 with 2 KB on-board RAM instead of the intended 4 KB. The T414 was available in 15 and 20 MHz varieties. The RAM was later reinstated to 4 KB on the T425 (in 20, 25, and 30 MHz varieties), which also added the J 0 breakpoint support and extra T800 instructions. The T400, released in September 1989, was a low-cost 20 MHz T425 derivative with 2 KB and two instead of four links, intended for the embedded systems market.

=== T8: floating point ===
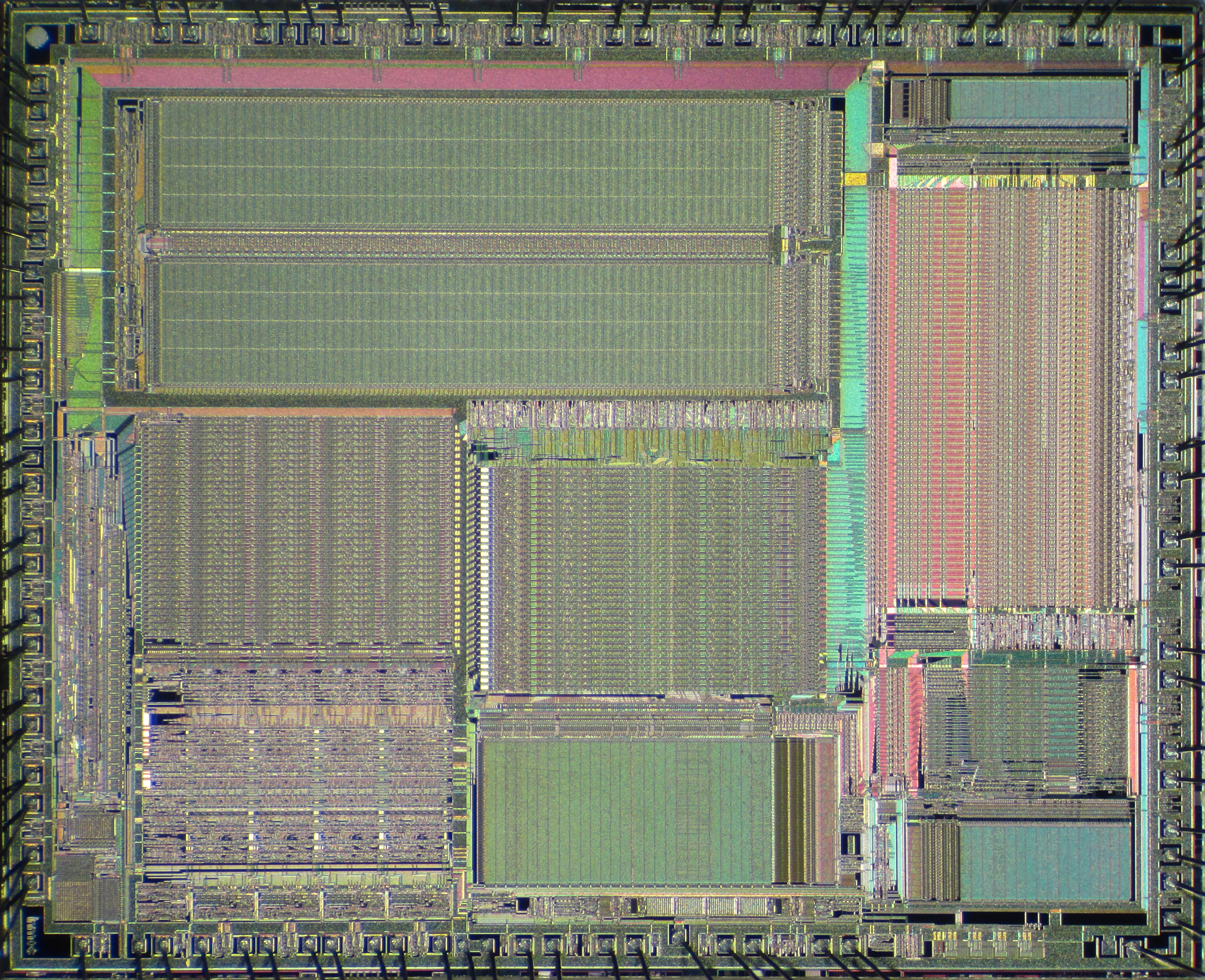
Inmos T805 die

The second-generation T800 transputer, introduced in 1987, had an extended instruction set. The most important addition was a 64-bit floating-point unit (FPU) and three added registers for floating point, implementing the IEEE 754-1985 floating point standard. It also had 4 KB of on-board RAM and was available in 20 or 25 MHz versions. Breakpoint support was added in the later T801 and T805, the former featuring separate address and data buses to improve performance. The T805 was also later available as a 30 MHz part.

An enhanced T810 was planned, which would have had more RAM, more and faster links, extra instructions, and improved microcode, but this was cancelled around 1990.

Inmos also produced a variety of support chips for the transputer processors, such as the C004 32-way link switch and the C011 and C012 "link adapters" which allowed transputer links to be interfaced to an 8-bit data bus.

=== T400 ===
Part of the original Inmos strategy was to make CPUs so small and cheap that they could be combined with other logic in one device. Although a system on a chip (SoC) as they are commonly termed, are ubiquitous now, the concept was almost unheard of back in the early 1980s. Two projects were started in around 1983, the M212 and the TV-toy. The M212 was based on a standard T212 core with the addition of a disk controller for the ST 506 and ST 412 Shugart standards. TV-toy was to be the basis for a video game console and was joint project between Inmos and Sinclair Research.

The links in the T212 and T414/T424 transputers had hardware DMA engines so that transfers could happen in parallel with execution of other processes. A variant of the design, termed the T400, not to be confused with a later transputer of the same name, was designed where the CPU handled these transfers. This reduced the size of the device considerably since 4 link engines were approximately the same size as the whole CPU. The T400 was intended to be used as a core in what were then called systems on silicon (SOS) devices, now termed and better known as system on a chip (SoC). It was this design that was to form part of TV-toy. The project was cancelled in 1985.

=== T100 ===
Although the prior SoC projects had had only limited success (the M212 was sold for a time), many designers still firmly believed in the concept and in 1987, a new project, the T100 was started which combined an 8-bit version of the transputer CPU with configurable logic based on state machines. The transputer instruction set is based on 8-bit instructions and can easily be used with any word size which is a multiple of 8 bits. The target market for the T100 was to be bus controllers such as Futurebus, and an upgrade for the standard link adapters (C011 etc.). The project was stopped when the T840 (later to become the basis of the T9000) was started.

T2, T4, and T8 series transputers

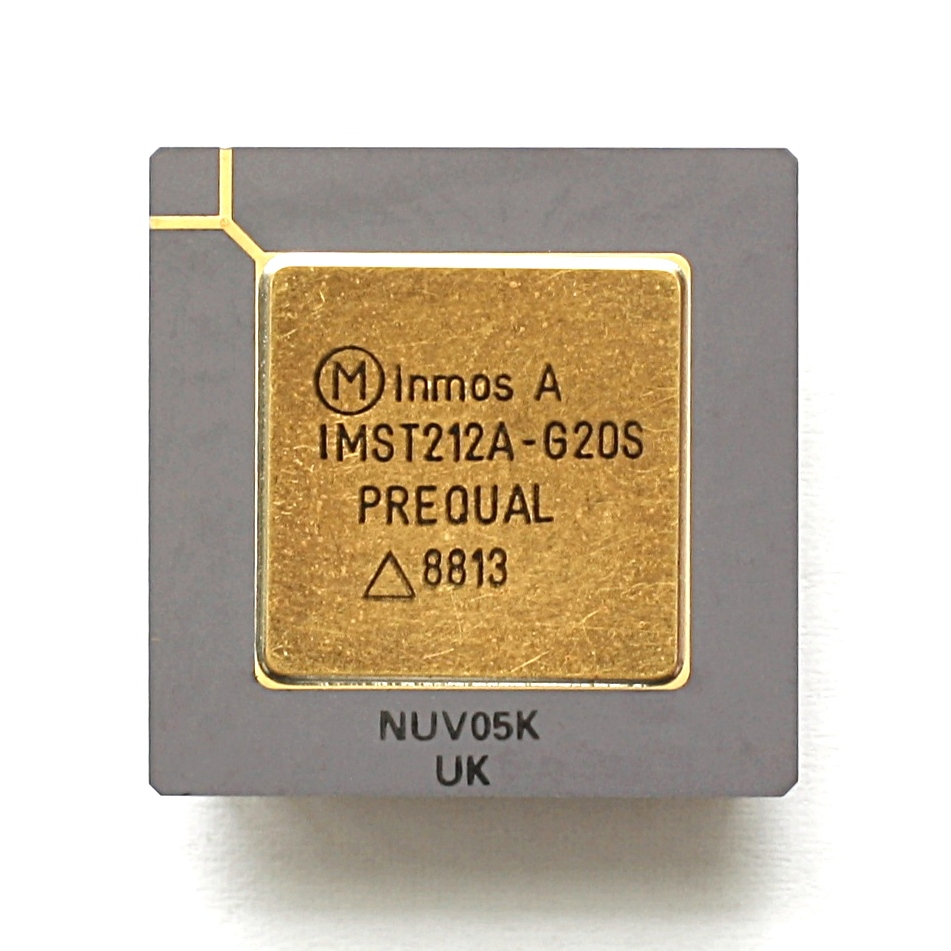
Inmos T212, PREQUAL

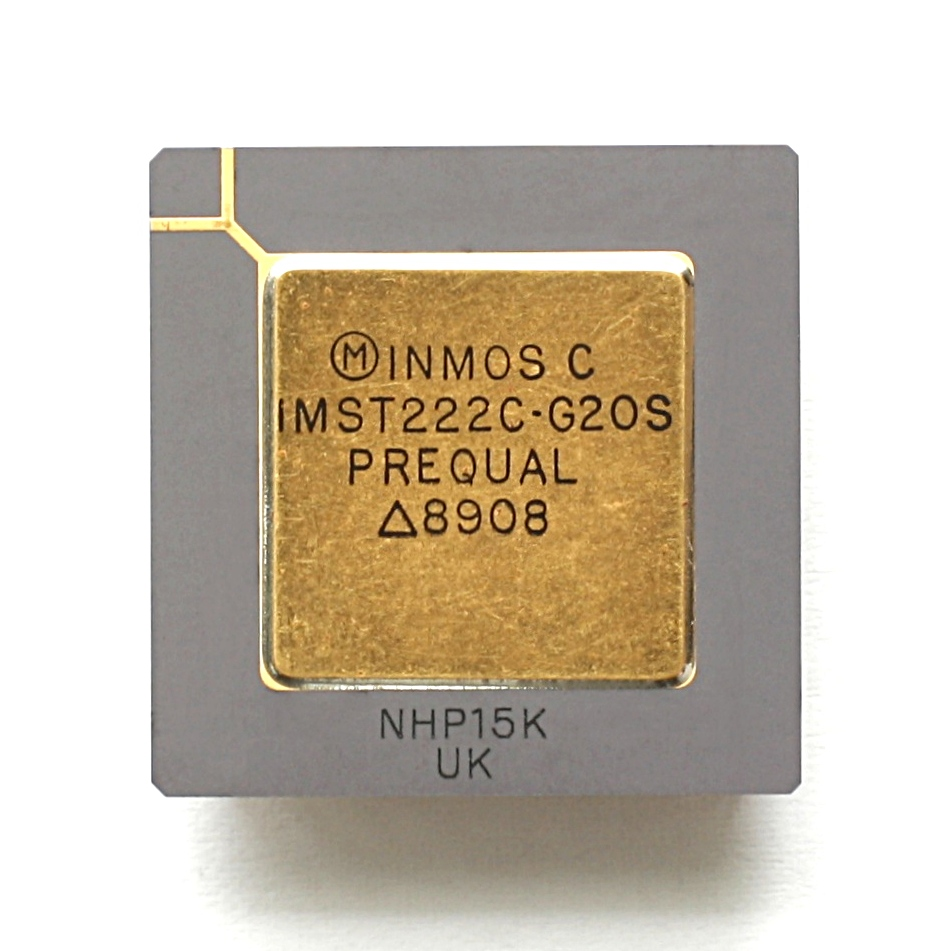
Inmos T222, PREQUAL

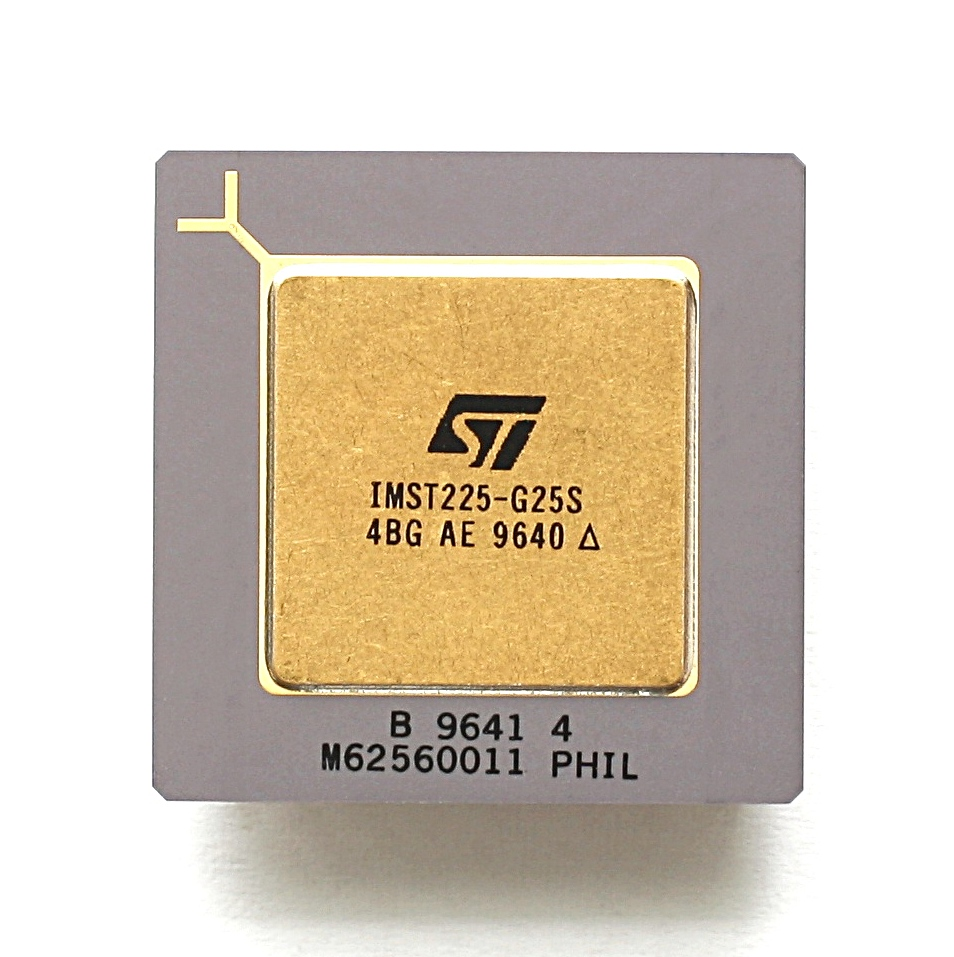
STMicroelectronics IMST225 (Inmos T225)

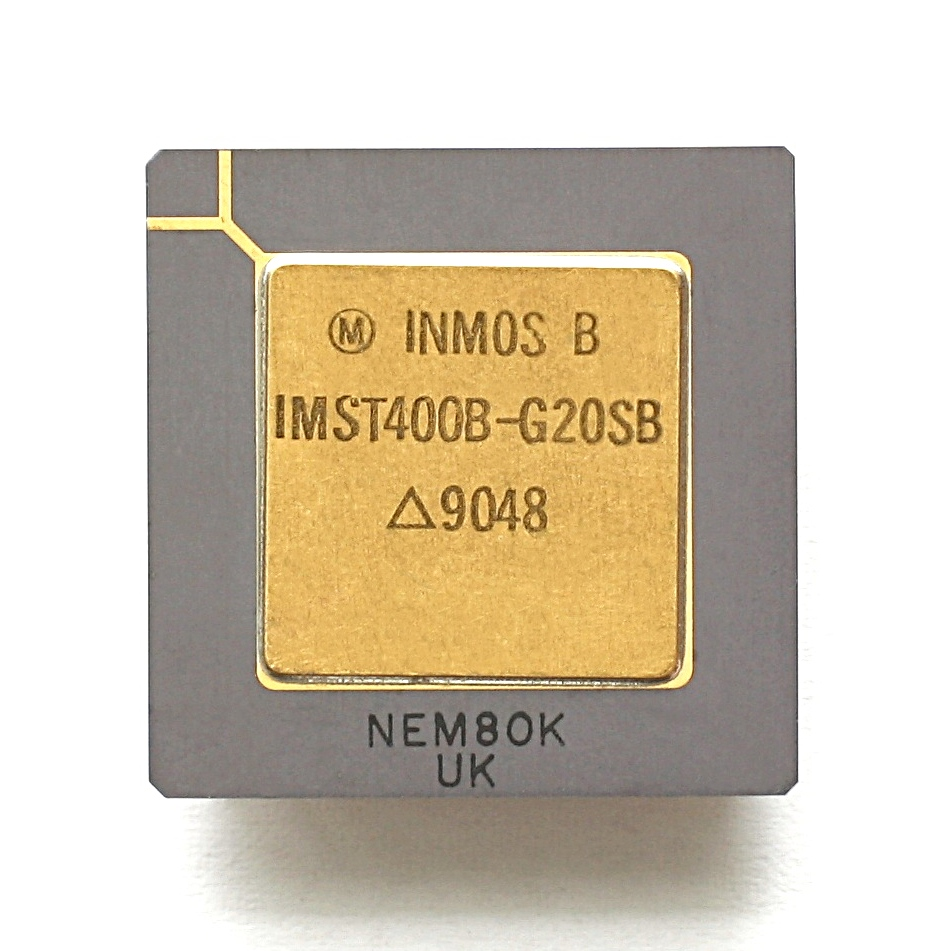
Inmos T400

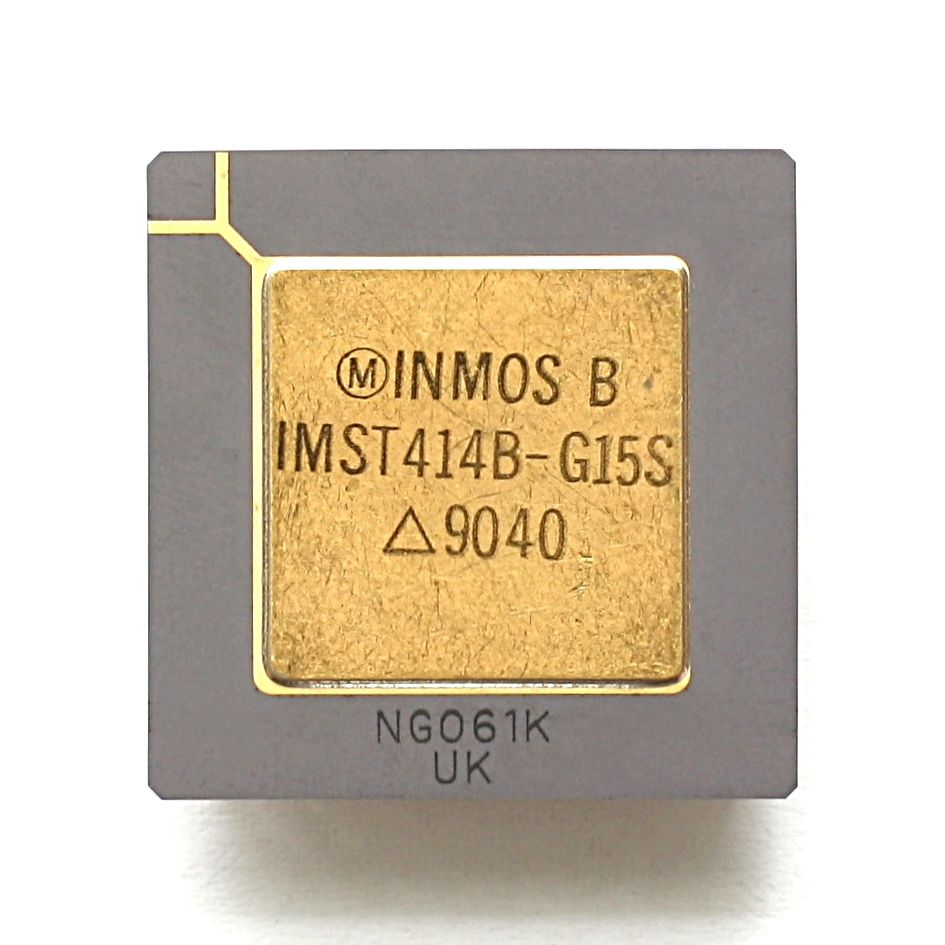
Inmos T414

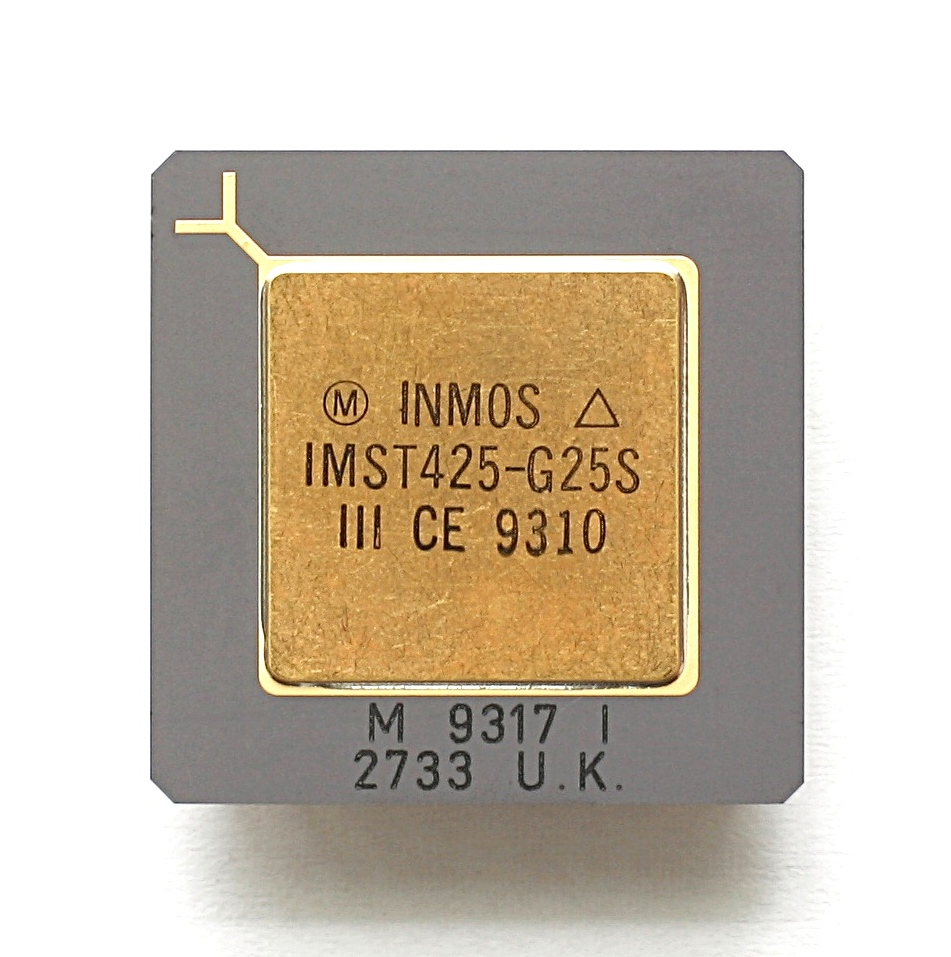
Inmos T425

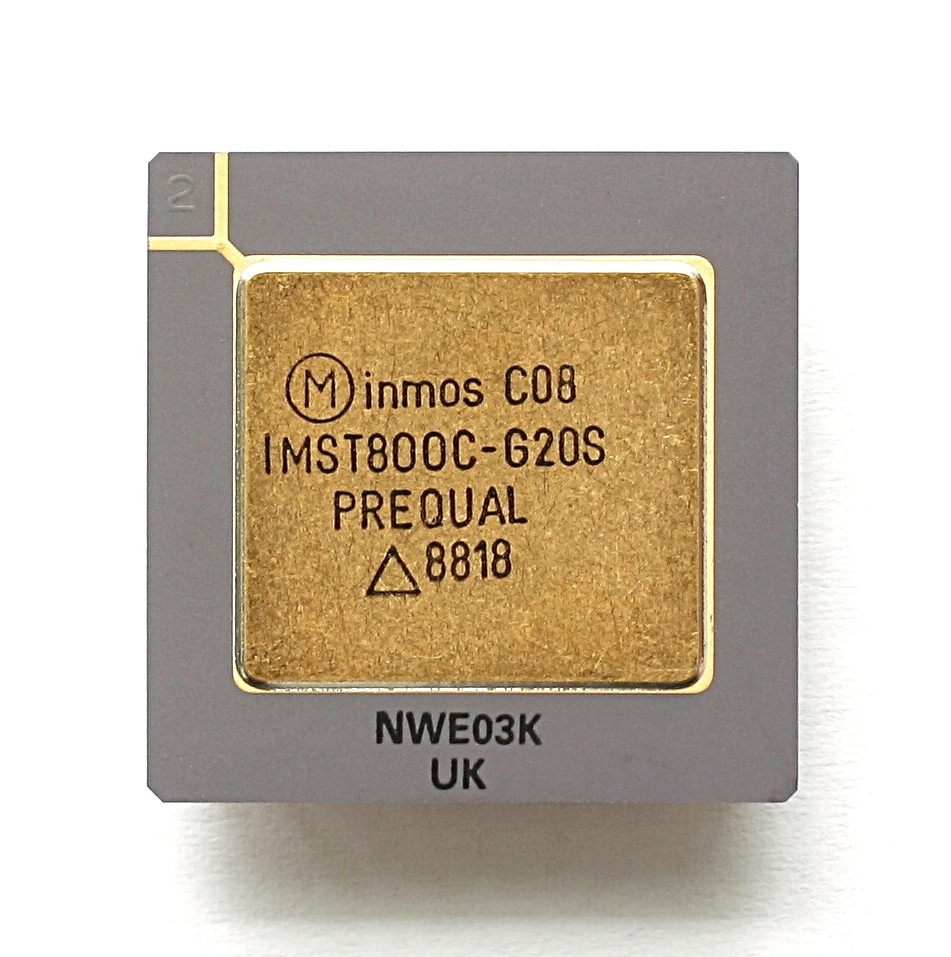
Inmos T800, PREQUAL

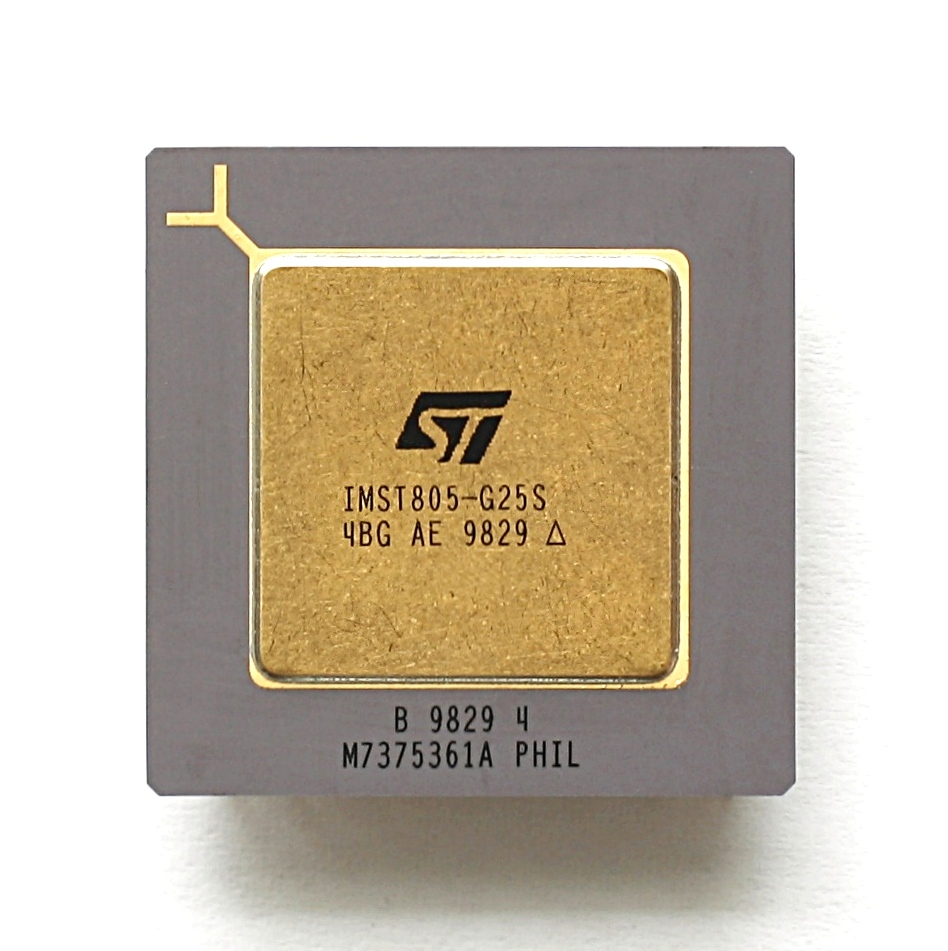
STMicroelectronics IMST805 (Inmos T805)

=== TPCORE ===
TPCORE is an implementation of the transputer, including the os-links, that runs in a field-programmable gate array (FPGA).

=== T9000 ===
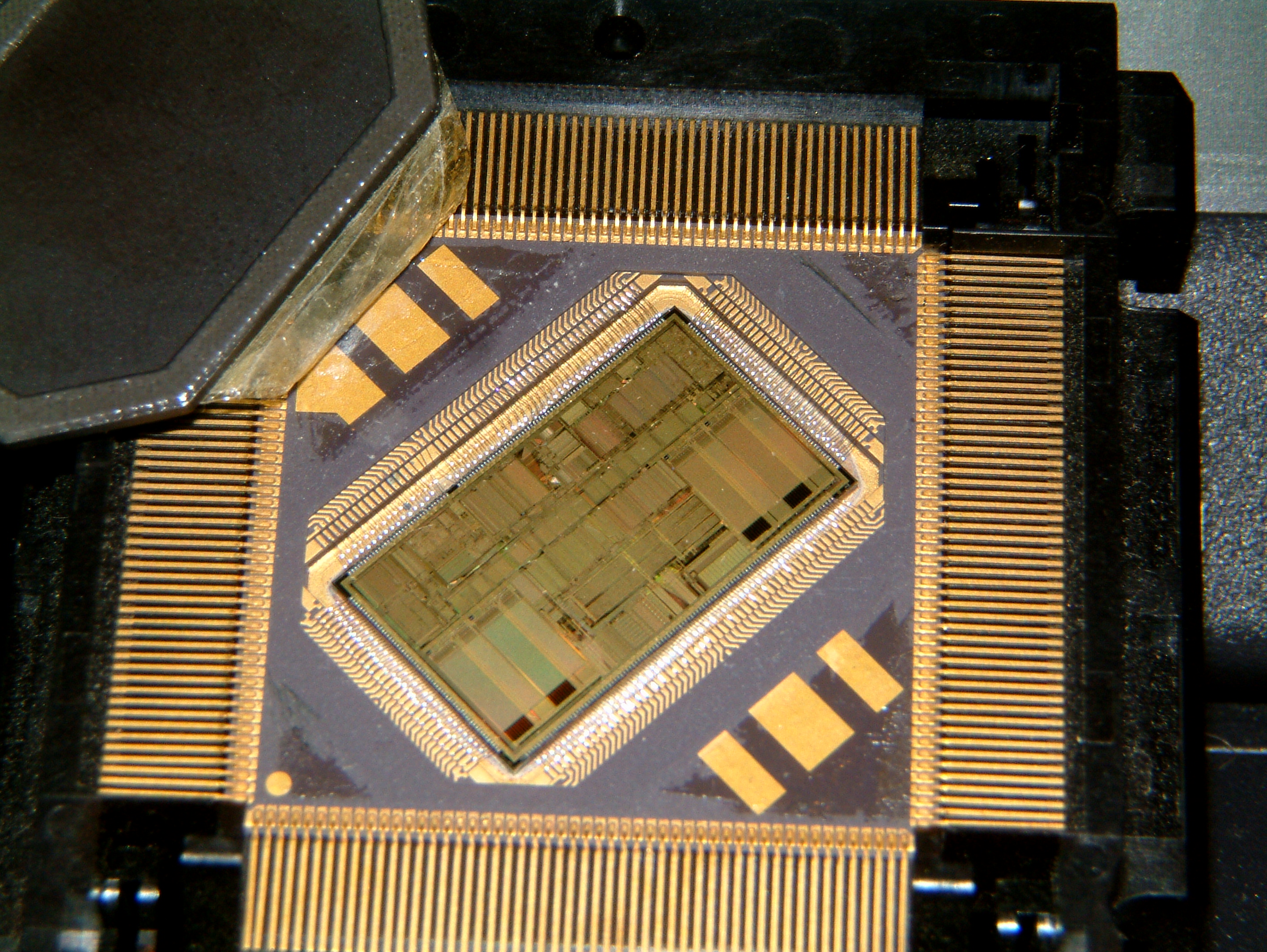
T9000 Transputer with lid removed to show silicon die

Inmos improved on the performance of the T8 series transputers with the introduction of the T9000 (code-named H1 during development). The T9000 shared most features with the T800, but moved several pieces of the design into hardware and added several features for superscalar support. Unlike the earlier models, the T9000 had a true 16 KB high-speed cache (using random replacement) instead of RAM, but also allowed it to be used as memory and included MMU-like functionality to handle all of this (termed the PMI). For more speed the T9000 cached the top 32 locations of the stack, instead of three as in earlier versions.

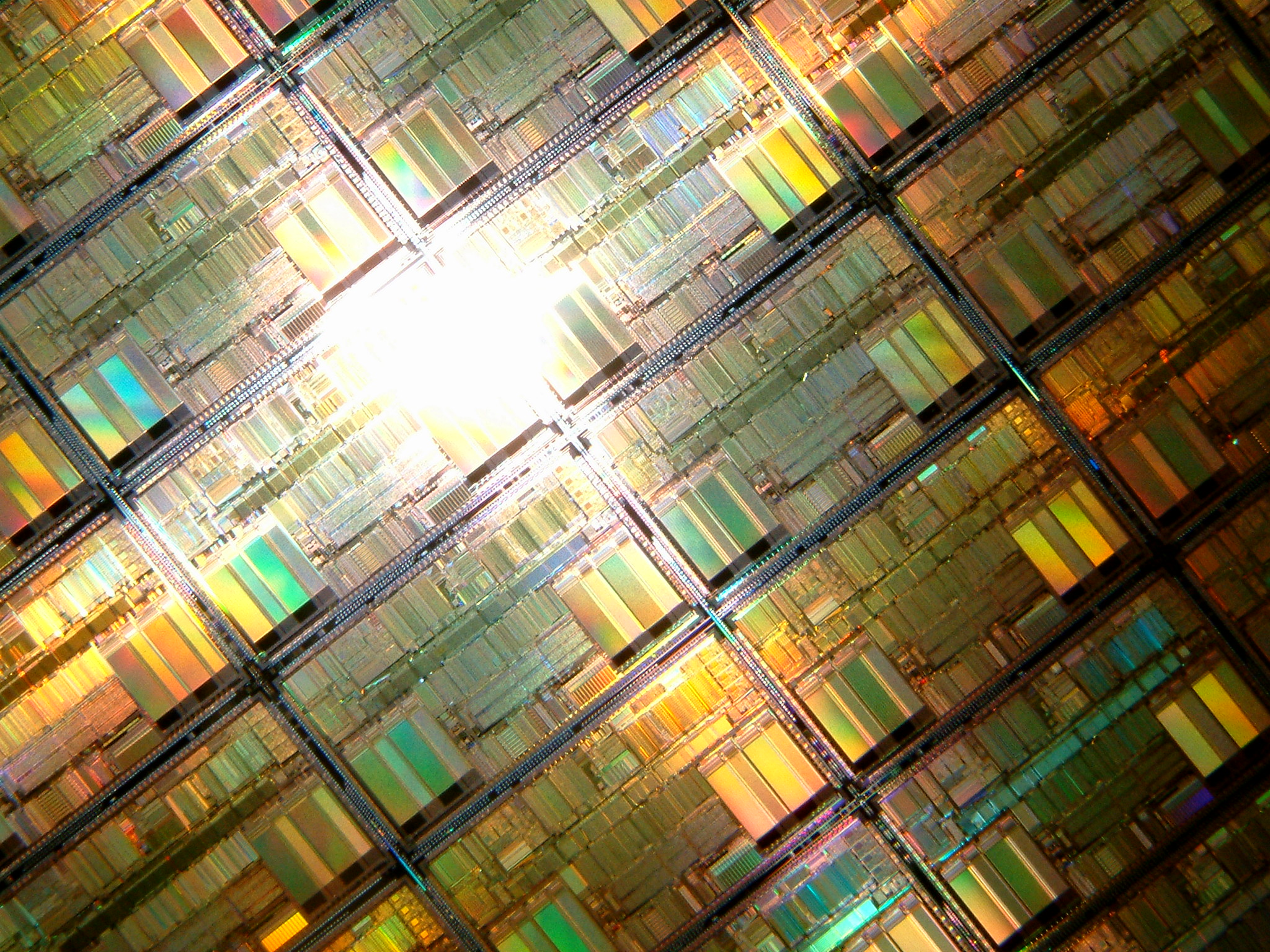
Uncut silicon wafer of Inmos T9000 transputers

The T9000 used a five-stage pipeline for even more speed. An interesting addition was the grouper which would collect instructions out of the cache and group them into larger packages of up to 8 bytes to feed the pipeline faster. Groups then completed in one cycle, as if they were single larger instructions working on a faster CPU.

The link system was upgraded to a new 100 MHz mode, but unlike the prior systems, the links were no longer downwardly compatible. This new packet-based link protocol was called DS-Link, and later formed the basis of the IEEE 1355 serial interconnect standard. The T9000 also added link routing hardware called the VCP (Virtual Channel Processor) which changed the links from point-to-point to a true network, allowing for the creation of any number of virtual channels on the links. This meant programs no longer had to be aware of the physical layout of the connections. A range of DS-Link support chips were also developed, including the C104 32-way crossbar switch, and the C101 link adapter.

Long delays in the T9000's development meant that the faster load/store designs were already outperforming it by the time it was to be released. It consistently failed to reach its own performance goal of beating the T800 by a factor of ten. When the project was finally cancelled it was still achieving only about 36 MIPS at 50 MHz. The production delays gave rise to the quip that the best host architecture for a T9000 was an overhead projector.

This was too much for Inmos, which did not have the funding needed to continue development. By this time, the company had been sold to SGS-Thomson (now STMicroelectronics), whose focus was the embedded systems market, and eventually the T9000 project was abandoned. However, a comprehensively redesigned 32-bit transputer intended for embedded applications, the ST20 series, was later produced, using some technology developed for the T9000. The ST20 core was incorporated into chipsets for set-top box and Global Positioning System (GPS) applications.

=== ST20 ===
Although not strictly a transputer, the ST20 was heavily influenced by the T4 and T9 and formed the basis of the T450, which was arguably the last of the transputers. The mission of the ST20 was to be a reusable core in the then emerging SoC market. The original name of the ST20 was the Reusable Micro Core (RMC). The architecture was loosely based on the original T4 architecture with a microcode-controlled data path. However, it was a full redesign, using VHDL as the design language and with an optimized (and rewritten) microcode compiler. The project was conceived as early as 1990 when it was realized that the T9 would be too big for many applications. Actual design work started in mid-1992. Several trial designs were done, ranging from a very simple RISC-style CPU with complex instructions implemented in software via traps to a rather complex superscalar design similar in concept to the Tomasulo algorithm. The final design looked very similar to the original T4 core although some simple instruction grouping and a workspace cache were added to help with performance.

== Adoption ==
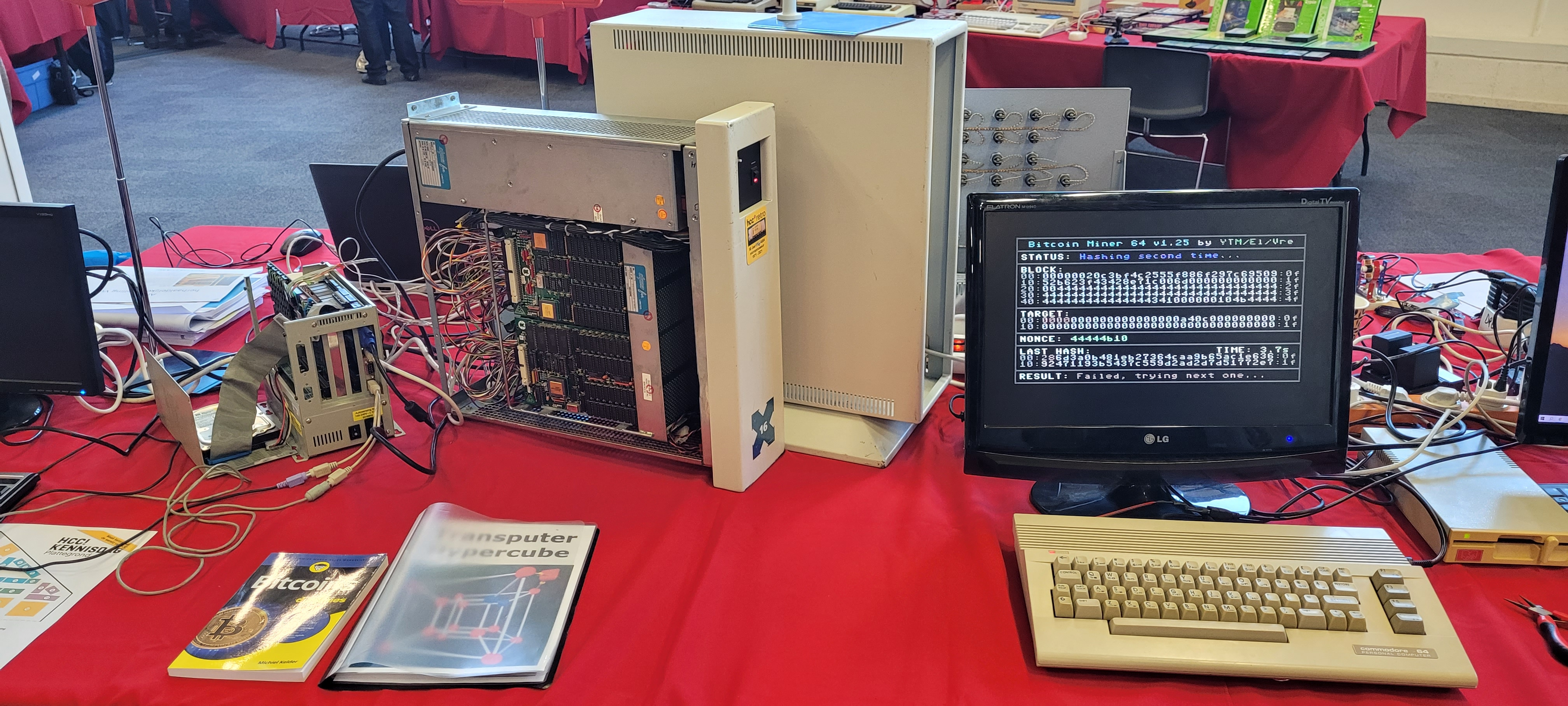
Transputer-based computer (left)

While the transputer was simple but powerful compared to many contemporary designs, it never came close to meeting its goal of being used universally in both CPU and microcontroller roles. In the microcontroller market, the market was dominated by 8-bit machines where cost was under serious consideration. Here, even the T2s were too powerful and costly for most users.

In the computer desktop and workstation field, the transputer was fairly fast (operating at about 10 million instructions per second (MIPS) at 20 MHz). This was excellent performance for the early 1980s, but by the time the floating-point unit (FPU) equipped T800 was shipping, other RISC designs had surpassed it. This could have been mitigated to a large extent if machines had used multiple transputers as planned, but T800s cost about $400 each when introduced, which meant a poor price/performance ratio. Few transputer-based workstation systems were designed; the most notable likely being the Atari Transputer Workstation.

The transputer was more successful in the field of massively parallel computing, where several vendors produced transputer-based systems in the late 1980s. These included Meiko Scientific (founded by ex-Inmos employees), Floating Point Systems, Parsytec, and Parsys. Several British academic institutions founded research activities in the application of transputer-based parallel systems, including Bristol Polytechnic's Bristol Transputer Centre and the University of Edinburgh's Edinburgh Concurrent Supercomputer Project. Also, the Data Acquisition and Second Level Trigger systems of the High Energy Physics ZEUS Experiment for the Hadron Elektron Ring Anlage (HERA) collider at DESY was based on a network of over 300 synchronously clocked transputers divided into several subsystems. These controlled both the readout of the custom detector electronics and ran reconstruction algorithms for physics event selection.

The parallel processing abilities of the transputer were put to use commercially for image processing by the world's largest printing company, RR Donnelley & Sons, in the early 1990s. The ability to quickly transform digital images in preparation for print gave the firm a significant edge over their competitors. This development was led by Michael Bengtson in the RR Donnelley Technology Center. Within a few years, the processing ability of even desktop computers ended the need for custom multi-processing systems for the firm.

The German company Jäger Messtechnik used transputers for their early ADwin real-time data acquisition and control products.

A French company built the Archipel Volvox Supercomputer with up to 144 T800 and T400 Transputers. It was controlled by a Silicon Graphics Indigo2 running UNIX and a special card that interfaced to the Volvox backplanes.

Transputers also found use in protocol analysers such as the Siemens/Tektronix K1103 and in military applications where the array architecture suited applications such as radar and the serial links (that were high speed in the 1980s) served well to save cost and weight in sub-system communications.

The transputer also appeared in products related to virtual reality such as the ProVision 100 system made by Division Limited of Bristol, featuring a combination of Intel i860, 80486/33 and Toshiba HSP processors, together with T805 or T425 transputers, implementing a rendering engine that could then be accessed as a server by PC, Sun SPARCstation or VAX systems.

Myriade, a European miniaturized satellite platform developed by Astrium Satellites and CNES and used by satellites such as the Picard, is based on the T805 yielding around 4 MIPS and is scheduled to stay in production until about 2015.

The asynchronous operation of the communications and computation allowed the development of asynchronous algorithms, such as Bane's "Asychronous Polynomial Zero Finding" algorithm. The field of asynchronous algorithms, and the asynchronous implementation of current algorithms, is likely to play a key role in the move to exascale computing.

The High Energy Transient Explorer 2 (HETE-2) spacecraft used 4× T805 transputers and 8× DSP56001 yielding about 100 million instructions per second (MIPS) of performance.

== Legacy ==
Growing internal parallelism has been one driving force behind improvements in conventional CPU designs. Instead of explicit thread-level parallelism (as is used in the transputer), CPU designs exploited implicit parallelism at the instruction-level, inspecting code sequences for data dependencies and issuing multiple independent instructions to different execution units. This is termed superscalar processing. Superscalar processors are suited for optimising the execution of sequentially constructed fragments of code. The combination of superscalar processing and speculative execution delivered a tangible performance increase on existing bodies of code – which were mostly written in Pascal, Fortran, C and C++. Given these substantial and regular performance improvements to existing code there was little incentive to rewrite software in languages or coding styles which expose more task-level parallelism.

Nevertheless, the model of cooperating concurrent processors can still be found in cluster computing systems that dominate supercomputer design in the 21st century. Unlike the transputer architecture, the processing units in these systems typically use superscalar CPUs with access to substantial amounts of memory and disk storage, running conventional operating systems and network interfaces. Resulting from the more complex nodes, the software architecture used for coordinating the parallelism in such systems is typically far more heavyweight than in the transputer architecture.

The fundamental transputer motive remains, yet was masked for over 20 years by the repeated doubling of transistor counts. Inevitably, microprocessor designers finally ran out of uses for the greater physical resources, almost at the same time when technology scaling began to hit its limits. Power consumption, and thus heat dissipation needs, render further clock rate increases unfeasible. These factors led the industry towards solutions little different in essence from those proposed by Inmos.

Many supercomputers in the world, based on designs from Columbia University and built as IBM Blue Gene, are real-world versions of the transputer concept. They are assemblies of identical, relatively low-performance SoCs.

Recent trends have also tried to solve the transistor dilemma in ways that would have been too futuristic even for Inmos. On top of adding components to the CPU die and placing multiple dies in one system, modern processors increasingly place multiple cores in one die. The transputer designers struggled to fit even one core into its transistor budget. Today designers, working with a 1000-fold increase in transistor densities, can now typically place many. One of the most recent commercial developments has emerged from the firm XMOS, which has developed a family of embedded multi-core multi-threaded processors which resonate strongly with the transputer and Inmos. There is an emerging class of multicore/manycore processors taking the approach of a network on a chip (NoC), such as the Cell processor, Adapteva Epiphany architecture, Tilera, etc.

The transputer and Inmos helped establish Bristol, UK, as a hub for microelectronic design and innovation.

== See also ==
- Adapteva
- David May (computer scientist)
- Ease (programming language)
- IEEE 1355
- Inmos
- iWarp
- Meiko Computing Surface
