= 80 Days =

80 Days or Eighty Days may refer to:

- 80 Days (2005 video game), a 2005 video game for Windows developed by Frogwares
- 80 Days (2014 video game), a 2014 video game developed by Inkle
- "Eighty Days", by Marillion from their 1997 album This Strange Engine

== See also ==
- Around the World in Eighty Days, a novel by Jules Verne
- Around the World in Eighty Days (disambiguation)
