= Around the World in Eighty Days (disambiguation) =

Around the World in Eighty Days is a novel by Jules Verne.

Around the World in Eighty Days may also refer to:

== Film ==
- Around the World in Eighty Days (1919 film), a 1919 German silent adventure comedy film
- Around the World in 80 Days (1956 film), an adaptation starring David Niven
- Around the World in 80 Days (1988 film), an Australian animated adaptation
- Around the World in 80 Days (2004 film), an adaptation starring Jackie Chan and Steve Coogan
- Around the World in 80 Days (2021 film), a French animated adaptation

== Television ==
- Around the World in 80 Days with Michael Palin, a 1989 UK travel TV series made by the BBC
- Around the World in Eighty Days (1972 TV series), a one-season Australian animated television adaptation
- Around the World in 80 Days (miniseries), a 1989 adaptation starring Pierce Brosnan
- Around the World in 80 Days (2009 TV series), a UK reality TV series
- Around the World in 80 Days (2021 TV series), a one-season dramatic adaptation starring David Tennant

== Other uses ==
- Around the World in 80 Days (Alton Towers), an amusement ride
- Around the World in 80 Days (Palin book), a 1989 companion to the TV series
- Around the World in 80 Days (video game), a video game based on the 2004 movie
- Around the World in 80 Days (board game), a 2004 designer board game
- Around the World in 80 Days, a match-three video game by Playrix, based on the novel.

== See also ==
- 80 Days (disambiguation)
- Around the World (disambiguation)
- Around the World in Eighteen Days (1923), a film serial
- Around the Day in Eighty Worlds (1967), a book by Julio Cortázar
- Around the World with Willy Fog (1984), a Spanish animated adaptation of Jules Verne's novel
- Around the World in a Day (1985), an album by Prince
- Around the World in 80 Ways (1988), an Australian film
- Around the World in 20 Years (2008), a TV documentary starring Michael Palin
- Around the World in 80 Ways (2011), an American reality TV show
