= Around the World =

Around the World may refer to:

- Circumnavigation, to navigate a circumference, as around the Earth

== Books and publications ==
- Around the World (magazine), a Russian magazine

== Film and TV ==
- Around the World (1943 film), a film starring Kay Kyser
- Around the World (1962 film) (주유천하, Ju Yu Cheonha), a Korean film
- Around the World (1967 film), a Bollywood romantic comedy

== Music ==
- Around the World (musical), a musical by Cole Porter
- Around the World (video), a concert DVD by Mariah Carey
- Around the World (1997 film), a documentary about the band Aqua

=== Albums ===
- Around the World (Ami Suzuki album), and the title song (see below)
- Around the World (Bad Boys Blue album)
- Around the World (Melo-M album)
- Around the World (Wilber Pan album)
- Around the World Live, a box set by Deep Purple

=== Songs ===
- "Around the World" (1956 song)
- "Around the World" (Ami Suzuki song)
- "Around the World" (Aqua song)
- "Around the World" (Christina Aguilera song)
- "Around the World" (Daft Punk song)
- "Around the World" (East 17 song)
- "Around the World" (Got7 song)
- "Around the World" (Natalie La Rose song)
- "Around the World" (Red Hot Chili Peppers song)
- "Around the World (La La La La La)", by ATC
- "Around the World", by Kings of Leon from Walls
- "Around the World", by m.o.v.e from Electrock
- "Around the World", by Monkey Majik from Thank You
- "Round the World", by Dannii Minogue from Club Disco

== Sports and games ==
- Around the World (basketball), a basketball variant
- Around the World (football trick), a juggling skill in football (soccer)
- Around the world (card game), a drinking game
- Around the world, a trick performed with a Yo-yo

== See also ==
- Around the World in Eighty Days (disambiguation)
- You Are Here: Around the World in 92 Minutes
- All Around the World (disambiguation)
