= Atari ST BASIC =

- Atari ST BASIC (edit-window hidden)
- Original author: MetaComCo
- Release: 1985; 41 years ago
- Platform: Atari ST
- Type: BASIC

Atari ST BASIC (or ST Basic) was the first dialect of BASIC that was produced for the Atari ST line of computers. This BASIC interpreter was bundled with all new STs in the early years of the ST's lifespan, and quickly became the standard BASIC for that platform. However, many users disliked it, and improved dialects of BASIC quickly came out to replace it.

== Development ==
Atari Corporation commissioned MetaComCo to write a version of BASIC that would take advantage of the GEM environment on the Atari ST. This was based on a version already written for Digital Research called DR-Basic, which was bundled with DR's CP/M-86 operating system. The result was called ST BASIC. At the time the ST was launched, ST BASIC was bundled with all new STs.

A further port of the same language called ABasiC was supplied for a time with the Amiga, but Commodore quickly replaced it with the Microsoft-developed AmigaBASIC.

== Interface ==
The user interface consists of four windows:

1. EDIT, for entering source code
2. LIST, where the source code can be browsed
3. COMMAND, where instructions are entered and immediately executed
4. OUTPUT

The windows can only be selected with the mouse.

== Bugs ==
ST BASIC has many bugs. Compute! in September 1987 reported on one flaw that it described as "among the worst BASIC bugs of all time". Typing x = 18.9 results in

function not yet done
System error #%N, please restart

Similar commands, such as x = 39.8 or x = 4.725, crash the computer; the magazine described the results of the last command as "as bad a crash as you can get on the ST without seeing the machine rip free from its cables, drag itself to the edge of the desk, and leap into the trash bin". After citing other flaws (such as ? 257 * 257 and ? 257 ^ 2 not being equivalent) the magazine recommended "avoid[ing] ST BASIC for serious programming". Regarding reports that MetaComCo was "one bug away" from releasing a long-delayed update to the language, it jokingly wondered "whether Atari has only one more bug to eliminate from ST BASIC or one more to add".

== Alternatives ==
The relatively low quality of ST BASIC quickly opened up a market for third-party BASICs on the ST. FaST BASIC and GFA BASIC were two of the first of these third-party BASICs to be released. As these BASICS were not free, a program written in one of these BASICs could only be listed and run if the user had that BASIC. However, compilers and run-time executables started to appear for these BASICs that produced executable code that could run on all STs, and type-in programs became less fashionable, so there was no longer a need for a standard BASIC. By then, HiSoft BASIC, Omikron BASIC and STOS BASIC had appeared. Some of these BASICs even started to be bundled with new STs in the later years.

== Books ==
- Knight, Tim (1986). Understanding Atari ST BASIC Programming. Sybex. ISBN 0-89588-344-9.
- Atari ST BASIC Quick Reference Guide — by Atari, copyright 1986, revision A. {DDB-G22}
- ST BASIC Sourcebook and Tutorial. Atari. 1986. Revision B. {DDB-G22}
