= TRIPOS =

- Developer: University of Cambridge, University of Bath, MetaComCo, Open G I
- Written in: BCPL, Assembly language
- Working state: Discontinued
- Initial release: 1978; 48 years ago
- Supported platforms: PDP-11, Computer Automation LSI4, Data General Nova, Motorola 68000, Intel 8086, Cintcode BCPL (VM)

TRIPOS (Trivial Portable Operating System) is a computer operating system. Development started in 1976 at the Computer Laboratory of Cambridge University and it was headed by Dr. Martin Richards. The first version appeared in January 1978 and it originally ran on a PDP-11. Later it was ported to the Computer Automation LSI4 and the Data General Nova. Work on a Motorola 68000 version started in 1981 at the University of Bath. MetaComCo acquired the rights to the 68000 version and continued development until TRIPOS was chosen by Commodore in March 1985 to form part of an operating system for their new Amiga computer; it was also used at Cambridge as part of the Cambridge Distributed Computing System.

Students in the Computer Science department at Cambridge affectionately refer to TRIPOS as the Terribly Reliable, Incredibly Portable Operating System. The name TRIPOS also refers to the Tripos system of undergraduate courses and examinations, which is unique to Cambridge University.

== Influences on the Amiga computer ==
In July 1985, the Amiga was introduced, incorporating TRIPOS in the AmigaDOS module of AmigaOS. AmigaDOS included a command-line interface and the Amiga File System. The entire AmigaDOS module was originally written in BCPL (an ancestor of the C programming language), the same language used to write TRIPOS. AmigaDOS would later be rewritten in C from AmigaOS 2.x onwards, retaining backwards compatibility with 1.x up until AmigaOS 4 (completely rewritten in C) when AmigaDOS abandoned its BCPL legacy.

== Features ==
TRIPOS provided features such as pre-emptive multi-tasking (using strict-priority scheduling), a hierarchical file system and multiple command line interpreters.

The most important TRIPOS concepts have been the non-memory-management approach (meaning no checks are performed to stop programs from using unallocated memory) and message passing by means of passing pointers instead of copying message contents. Those two concepts together allowed for sending and receiving over 1250 packets per second on a 10 MHz Motorola 68010 CPU.

Most of TRIPOS was implemented in BCPL. The kernel and device drivers were implemented in assembly language.

One notable feature of TRIPOS/BCPL was its cultural use of shared libraries, untypical at the time, resulting in small and therefore fast loading utilities. For example, many of the standard system utilities were well below 0.5 KB in size, compared to a typical minimum of about 20 KB for functionally equivalent code on a modern Unix or Linux.

TRIPOS was ported to a number of machines, including the Data General Nova 2, the Computer Automation LSI4, Motorola 68000 and Intel 8086-based hardware. The original 68000 port was by Dr Tim King, who brought it with him when he came to work with British development-tools software company MetaComCo. For that company, he ported TRIPOS to the SAGE II and SAGE IV machines from Sage Computer Technology. Among other things, MetaComCo was a specialist in 680x0 compilers, which is why Commodore approached the company to help with a DOS for its new Amiga computer.

TRIPOS was offered as the standard operating system on the Microbox III, a computer based on the Motorola 68010 produced by Micro Concepts, alongside alternatives such as CP/M and OS-9. It included support for the Cambridge Ring local area network.

=== Commands ===
The following list of commands is supported by the TRIPOS CLI.

- ALINK
- ASSEM
- ASSIGN
- BREAK
- C
- CD
- CONSOLE
- COPY
- DATE
- DELETE
- DIR
- DISKCOPY
- DISKDOCTOR
- ECHO
- ED
- EDIT
- ENDCLI
- FAILAT
- FAULT
- FILENOTE
- FORMAT
- IF
- INFO
- INSTALL
- JOIN
- LAB
- LIST
- MAKEDIR
- MOUNT
- NEWCLI
- PATH
- PROMPT
- PROTECT
- QUIT
- RELABEL
- RENAME
- RUN
- SEARCH
- SKIP
- SORT
- STACK
- STATUS
- TYPE
- VDU
- WAIT
- WHY

== Cintpos ==
Cintpos is an experimental interpretive version of TRIPOS which runs under Linux via the Cintcode BCPL virtual machine, also developed by Martin Richards. Cintpos was last updated in 2011.
