= All Around the World =

All Around the World may refer to:

== Music albums ==
- All Around the World (Jason Donovan album), or the title song
- All Around the World (Mindless Behavior album)
- "All Around the World", a 2007 album and music video by Ike Moriz

== Songs ==
- "All Around the World" (Justin Bieber song), 2013
- "All Around the World" (The Jam song), 1977
- "All Around the World" (Little Willie John song), 1955
- "All Around the World" (Oasis song), 1998
- "All Around the World" (Paulina Rubio song), 2011
- "All Around the World" (Lisa Stansfield song), 1989
- "All Around the World", a song by Little Richard, the B-side of the 1956 single "The Girl Can't Help It"
- "All Around the World", a song by Ike Moriz, 2012
- "All Around the World", a song by Northern Line, 2000
- "All Around the World", a 2007 Lionel Richie song
- "All Around the World", a song used in the children's television series Fraggle Rock
- "All Around the World or the Myth of Fingerprints", a song by Paul Simon
- "All Around the World", a song by Black Eyed Peas from Masters of the Sun Vol. 1
- "All Around the World", a song by The Dead Milkmen

== Other uses ==
- All Around the World Productions, an English record label

== See also ==
- Around the World (disambiguation)
