= MetaComCo =

English software company

- Type: Limited
- Industry: Software
- Founded: 1981
- Defunct: 1988
- Fate: Bankrupt
- Headquarters: Bristol, England
- Key people: Peter Mackeonis
- Products: BASIC interpreters AmigaDOS

MetaComCo (MCC) was a computer systems software company started in 1981 and based in Bristol, England by Peter Mackeonis and Derek Budge. A division of Tenchstar, Ltd.

MetaComCo's first product was an MBASIC compatible interpreter for IBM PCs, which was licensed by Peter Mackeonis to Digital Research in 1982, and issued as the Digital Research Personal Basic, running under CP/M. Other computer languages followed, also licensed by Digital Research and MetaComCo established an office in Pacific Grove, California, to service their United States customers.

In 1984 Dr. Tim King joined the company, bringing with him a version of the operating system TRIPOS for the Motorola 68000 processor which he had previously worked on whilst a researcher at the University of Cambridge.

This operating system was used as the basis of AmigaDOS (file-related functions of AmigaOS); MetaComCo won the contract from Commodore because the original planned Amiga disk operating system called Commodore Amiga Operating System (CAOS) was behind schedule; timescales were incredibly tight and TRIPOS provided a head start for a replacement system.

MetaComCo also developed ABasiC for the Amiga, the first BASIC interpreter provided with Amigas. MetaComCo also worked with Atari Corporation to produce the BASIC initially provided with the Atari ST in 1985: ST BASIC.

The company also sold the Lattice C compiler for the Sinclair QL and the Atari ST and range of other languages (e.g. Pascal, BCPL) for m68k-based computers. MetaComCo also represented LISP and REDUCE software from the RAND Corporation.

Several of the team at MetaComCo went on to found Perihelion Software. Mackeonis founded Triangle Publishing, the software publishing company responsible for creating the ST Organizer for the Atari ST and PC Organizer and Counterpoint (a GUI system) for Amstrad Computers and GoldStar computers.

MetaComCo BASIC was available on the Singapore Teleview videotext receiver.

MetaComCo was disestablished in 1988
