= Hypercube (disambiguation) =

A hypercube is a convex polytope, the n-dimensional analogue of a square and a cube.

It may also refer to:

- Cube 2: Hypercube, a film
- Tesseract, a four-dimensional object known as "the" hypercube
- Exponentiation for powers above 3
- Fourth power, more narrowly for the specific exponentiation to the power of 4, also known as n hypercubed

== See also ==
- Data cube
- Hypercube internetwork topology
  - Connection Machine, a derived computer
