= .au Domain Administration =

Manager of the .au domain

.au Domain Administration Ltd.
- Founded: 1999
- Type: Non-profit private company limited by guarantee
- Registration no.: 079 009 340
- Purpose: Policy authority and industry self-regulator body for the .au Country code top-level domain
- Location(s): PO Box 18315; Melbourne, VIC 3001; Australia
- Region served: Australia
- Key people: Dr Bruce Tonkin (CEO); Alan Cameron AO (Chair)
- Website: auda.org.au
- ABN 38 079 009 340

.au Domain Administration (auDA) is the policy authority and industry self-regulatory body for the .au domain, which is the country-code top-level domain (ccTLD) for Australia. It was formed in 1999 to manage the .au ccTLD with the endorsement of the Australian Government and the authority of the Internet Corporation for Assigned Names and Numbers (ICANN). It is a not-for-profit membership organisation that promotes and protects the .au domain space.

== History ==
=== Early history of .au ===
The operation of the .au ccTLD began in 1986 with the delegation of .au administration to Robert Elz of the University of Melbourne by the Internet Assigned Numbers Authority (IANA). Elz devised the second-level domain (2LD) name structure, including .com.au, .net.au, .edu.au and .org.au, and introduced policies concerning eligibility for these domains. These policies included reserving the .com.au 2LD for registered commercial entities trading in Australia, and only being able to register a domain that closely aligned with a registrant's commercial name. Elz was responsible for the day-to-day operation of the .au ccTLD with all services provided free. By 1996, as businesses realised the commercial potential of the Internet, management of registrations became too great a job for Elz to accomplish by himself. Elz licensed the .com.au 2LD operation exclusively to Melbourne IT, the commercial arm of the University of Melbourne, for a term of five years.

Elz did not charge for domain services, but Melbourne IT ran domain registration on a for-profit basis, charging between $125–150 per year for registrations. Melbourne IT intended to remove the registration of pre-existing .com.au names whose owners had not paid registration fees by March 1997. This prompted ISP iiNet to file a class-action lawsuit on behalf of .com.au domain holders. iiNet withdrew this action when Melbourne IT assured them it would not remove existing domains until at least October 1997, when competition in the .com.au administration was expected to exist.

However, disenchantment in the way the .au domain was run persisted, leading to demand for a single regulatory body to oversee the namespace.

See .oz for the early history of .oz.au.

=== Birth of auDA ===
In recognition of the deteriorating state of .au, the Australian Internet community – primarily through several key industry associations and personalities – held a series of forums to work out a way forward. The result of this period of collaboration was the establishment in June 1997 of a new policy development body called Australian Domain Name Administration, or ADNA tasked with taking control of .au and operating the domain space for the public good.

ADNA, however, was marked by internal conflicts. After two years of internal struggles, ADNA was renamed .au Domain Administration (auDA) and adopted a new constitution, procedures, and board. The Department of Communications, Information Technology and the Arts set objectives for the new auDA board to reach in order for the new entity to gain endorsement as an industry self-regulatory body, endorsement achieved in December 2000.

=== Preparing the new regime ===
The inaugural board of the new organisation was elected in April 1999, and began the task of trying to help mould a new framework of policies for the .au domain space. As part of the process, the organisation obtained a reassignment of management of the .au domain space from the Internet Corporation for Assigned Names and Numbers (ICANN), which had absorbed the responsibility for global root domain administration from IANA. This was the first formal agreement ICANN ever signed with a ccTLD operator. With the endorsement of the Australian Government and ICANN, auDA became the recognised ccTLD body for the .au domain space.

auDA undertook reviews into .au domain policies. These reviews utilised experts from relevant fields to consider public and stakeholder submissions and feedback and devise policies. Key auDA panels that shaped the current .au landscape include the Name Policy Advisory Panel of 2000, and the Competition Model Advisory Panel of 2000. The latter concluded that the .au domain space should be as open as possible, with competition at both the domain name registry and the domain name registrar levels. The Name Policy Advisory Panel resulted in naming policy remaining mostly unchanged, with the exception of the .id.au sub-domain which was liberalised.

In 2001, as a result of the Competition Model Advisory Panel's report, the operation of five key .au registries – .com.au, .net.au, .org.au, .asn.au and .id.au was put to tender. The winning bidder(s) were to operate the registry for four years. One bid, encompassing all five registries, from AusRegistry won.

After 16 years of running the .AU registry, AusRegistry lost a competitive tender process to Afilias, who will take over the running of the .AU registry on 1 July 2018.

=== Growth and Liberalisation ===
The new regime of competition and name policy began on 1 July 2002, with AusRegistry as the new domain name registry operator with 282,632 domain names under management. The new domain environment saw an increase in registrations, growing by over 3,000 domains in the first month of operations. Further liberalisation of domain policies over the next few years, including the abolition of limits on the number of domains owned and removal of rules banning the registration of generic domains (such as flowers.com.au) saw the total domains under management grow to 710,428 by June 2006 – a growth of 252% in four years.

By January 2017, there were more than 3 million .au domains under the management of AusRegistry, with the .au domain space enjoying a trusted reputation among domains in Australia.

== Role ==
auDA is the policy authority and industry self-regulatory body for the .au domain space, charged with managing and maintaining a secure and stable domain name system. It achieves this through its main functions including: the development and implementation of domain name policy in the .au domain space, the licensing of 2LD registry operators, the accreditation and licensing of registrars and facilitating .au dispute resolutions.

Through its sponsorship agreement with ICANN, auDA represents .au at ICANN meetings and other international fora, and is also responsible for the management of the .au domain name system zone file. The zone file is a text file which contains a list of DNS servers for the second-level domains in the .au domain space and contains the IP addresses of DNS servers for .au and second-level domains, where those DNS servers themselves are within .au.

auDA also oversees and deploys new technologies and initiatives in the .au name space, which includes Domain Name System Security Extensions (DNSSEC) auDA's own Information Security Standard (ISS). The ISS security standard was developed by a security group formed by auDA after a compromise on a registrars data systems. The ISS standard is based on ISO 27001. The Total Internet Group comprising ddns.com.au, cheaperdomains.com.au & ib.com.au are the first registrars to be accredited in 2013 a world first for the domain name industry .

== Domain name policies ==
See Also: .au § Registration Policies and Rules

Informed by the original domain eligibility criteria developed by Robert Elz, auDA has maintained a policy of requiring registrants to have either an exact match or a "close and substantial connection" to their desired domain name. This "policy rich" approach to the name space, begun by Elz and continued by auDA, has meant the .au domain space has avoided the cybersquatting and other illicit uses of domains prevalent in other more permissive domains.

In 2016, the auDA board announced its decision to introduce direct registrations in .au – for example "yourname.au" – after the submission of the final report of the 2015 Names Policy Panel. This follows on from the introduction of direct registration in the .uk and .nz domain spaces. Direct registration was due to be implemented in 2017 but did not go ahead at that time. It was launched on 24 March 2022.

== Disputes and complaints ==
auDA is responsible for handling complaints and reducing fraud in domain name registration. This responsibility includes complaints regarding .au domain names, referred to as domain complaints and complaints concerning .au registrars and resellers, known as industry complaints.

This responsibility does not extend to complaints about the content or use of websites, which may be handled by the Australian Communications & Media Authority, the Telecommunications Industry Ombudsman, the Australian Competition & Consumer Commission, a state or territory fair trading office, the Office of the Australian Information Commissioner, or through civil court proceedings, depending on the nature and content of the complaint.

Domain complaints may relate to:

- domain name complaints under the .au Dispute Resolution Policy (auDRP);
- licensing complaints, including registrant eligibility;
- domain transfers;
- prohibited misspellings;
- other breaches of domain name licence terms and conditions.

Industry complaints may relate to the management or services provided by an auDA accredited registrar, breaches of auDA codes of practice or other policies. In some cases, this has involved legal action.

=== .au Dispute Resolution Policy (auDRP) Complaints ===
See: .au § .au Dispute Resolution Policy (auDRP)

=== Licensing Complaints ===
A licensing complaint may be made on the allegation that the domain name registrant does not comply with the auDA Licensing or Eligibility Rules applicable to the domain name.

Since April 2021, licensing complaints are handled directly by the domain name's registrar of record.

The sole remedy in a licensing complaint is cancellation of the domain name. Unlike auDRP complaints, the domain name cannot be transferred to the complainant. Once cancelled, the domain name again becomes available to the general public for registration.

=== Court Proceedings ===
Domain names may also be subject to court proceedings and orders. Participants in the auDRP Process are required to declare whether or not the relevant domain name is subject to a court proceeding.

For example, an Australian Court may make orders concerning a domain name on the basis of trade mark infringement, passing off, or misleading or deceptive conduct.

== Membership and organisational structure ==
auDA is a member based organisation. The .au member program is open to anyone eligible to hold a .au domain name. Members are entitled to vote at General Meetings of auDA and to nominate and elect representatives to the board of directors.

The auDA Board is ultimately responsible for directing the organisation. There are two distinct categories of directors, appointed directors and elected directors. Appointed directors are approved by the board. Elected directors are appointed via a ballot of .au members.

Dr Bruce Tonkin is the current CEO of auDA, beginning his term on 1 January 2025. Tonkin previously served as Chief Operating Officer (COO) of auDA from 2018 to 2024. Alan Cameron AO is the current Independent Chair of auDA having commenced the role in November 2019. Alan has an extensive legal background, more recently has worked as a consultant and company director.

Previous Board Chairs include Chris Leptos and Stuart Benjamin. Previous CEOs include Rosemary Sinclair AM, Cameron Boardman and Chris Disspain.

The Australian Government undertook a review of Australia's .au domain management in 2018, to ensure it remains fit for purpose in serving the needs of Australians online. auDA welcomed the government review.

== .au direct ==
On 24 March 2022, auDA launched a new namespace, .au direct which provides a greater choice of names for Australian websites and email addresses. The new namespace allows Australians to register domain names directly before the .au, (i.e., example.au).

The release of .au direct compliments existing Australian namespaces, including com.au, net.au, gov.au and org.au, and provides shorter, simpler Australian domain names.

=== Priority Allocation ===
When .au direct was introduced on 24 March 2022, all .au domain names registered prior to its launch were placed on a Priority Hold under the Priority Allocation Process. Priority Allocation provided an opportunity for those holding an existing .au domain name licence to apply for the matching .au direct name if they wished to do so. E.g. the licence holder of example.com.au could apply for example.au. The six-month Priority Allocation period opened on 24 March 2022, and ended on 20 September 2022. After that time, matching .au direct domain names without a priority application become available to be registered by eligible members of the public.

.au direct domain names proved popular with more than 716,000 .au direct names registered between March and December 2022.

== Open top and second-level domains managed by auDA ==
- .asn.au – For non-commercial organisations. Includes associations incorporated in any Australian State or Territory, political parties, trade unions, sporting or special interest clubs, charities or non-profit organisations.
- .au – For anyone with a validated Australian presence. Includes Australian citizens and residents and commercial entities registered in Australia.
- .com.au – For commercial purposes. Includes commercial entities, currently registered and trading in Australia, as well as commercial products and services.
- .id.au – For Australian individuals (citizens, residents).
- .net.au – For commercial purposes. Includes commercial entities, currently registered and trading in Australia, as well as commercial products and services.
- .org.au – For non-for-profit entities. Includes associations incorporated in any Australian State or Territory, political parties, trade unions, charities or non-profit organisations.

== Closed second-level domains ==
- .edu.au – For educational and training institutions, managed on behalf of auDA by Education Services Australia.
- .gov.au – For Australian Federal, State, Territory and Local government entities. Managed by the Digital Transformation Agency.
- .csiro.au – For the sole use of the CSIRO, managed by the CSIRO.

== Geographic second-level domains ==
Community geographic domain names were added in August 2006.

- .act.au – Australian Capital Territory
- .nsw.au – New South Wales
- .nt.au – Northern Territory
- .qld.au – Queensland
- .sa.au – South Australia
- .tas.au – Tasmania
- .vic.au – Victoria
- .wa.au – Western Australia

== See also ==
- Afilias
- AusRegistry
- Internet in Australia
- Internet governance
- Melbourne IT
- Robert Elz
