= Systemic Infrastructure Initiative =

Australian government programme

The Systemic Infrastructure Initiative was announced by the Government of Australia in January 2001 as part of Backing Australia's Ability – An Innovation Action Plan for the Future.

The Government announced that $246 million would be allocated over five years "to upgrade the basic infrastructure of universities, such as scientific and research equipment, libraries and laboratory facilities" to support research and research training.

Those eligible to apply are restricted to universities and other higher education institutions specified in Table A of the Higher Education Support Act 2003, Bond University and the University of Notre Dame Australia.

== Early committees ==
In 2002, as part of the SII funding, the Minister committed $250,000 to two committees, the Higher Education Information Infrastructure Implementation Steering Committee (HEIIAC) and Higher Education Bandwidth Advisory Committee (HEBAC). These committees were to formulae further broad projects to be considered for SII funding in the following year.

The Final Report of the Higher Education Information Infrastructure Advisory Committee was completed in November 2002.

== Australian Research Information Infrastructure Committee ==
As part of SII the Minister for Education, Science and Training, Dr Brendan Nelson, MP established the Australian Research Information Infrastructure Committee (ARIIC) in August 2003 to advise the Government on the information infrastructure requirements.

== 2002 round ==
- IMS Global Australia - Core Funding
- IMS COLIS Testbed
- Business Intelligence Lab (BIT Lab), University of New South Wales
- Clinical Trial Data and Information Network, Flexetrials, NHMRC Clinical Trials Centre, University of Sydney
- Australian Academic & Research Library Network, La Trobe University
- Joint Academic Scholarships On-line Network (JASON)
- Dataset Acquisition, Accessibility and Annotation e-Research Technology Project (DART)
- BIAcore 3000 for Discovery & Characterisation of Novel Pharmaceuticals
- Australian Research Libraries Collection Analysis Project
- Australian Partnership for Advanced Computing (APAC) 2004-2006
- Towards an Australian Partnership for Sustainable Repositories (APSR)

== Facilities and equipment ==
- Acquisition of next generation instruments in micro- and nano-analysis of solids and fluids in the geosciences and materials sciences, located in a purpose designed shared lab located at Macquarie University
- High Sensitivity, High Accuracy Mass Spectrometry for Advanced Molecular and Biomolecular Research, University of New South Wales
- Establishment of a nanofabrication facility at the Institute for Superconducting and Electronic Materials at the University of Wollongong
- Establishment of an Advanced Materials Manufacturing and Performance Centre, Deakin University
- Provision of high through-put DNA analysing machines for Population Biology Research and Research Training at La Trobe, the University of Queensland and Monash University
- Spatial and Sonological Information Laboratory, Royal Melbourne Institute of Technology. Digital Design Precinct
- Integrated Microfabrication Facility, Swinburne University of Technology
- Large Scale Experimental Building Fire Facility, Victoria University of Technology
- Improvements to the equipment and instrumentation level of the hypersonics facility at the University of Queensland
- A SHRIMP Ion Microprobe Facility for Earth Sciences, Curtin University of Technology
- ACIGA-LIGO High Optical Power Test Facility
- 3D-Imaging of Intact Root Systems in soil, University of Adelaide
- Upgrade of UV Radiation Monitoring Capabilities, University of Tasmania
- Upgrade facilities at Siding Spring Observatory, Australian National University

== Network ==
Over the course of the SSI program, many improvements to the national backbone were funded:

- Tasmanian Research and Education Network
- Victoria Education and Research Network (VERN)
- Marine Research and Education Network
- Australian Research and Education Network (AREN)
  - contribution towards accessing the AREN from the Charles Sturt University campuses at Wagga Wagga and Bathurst
  - interim solution (for 3 years) for high bandwidth connections from the Sunshine backbone to campuses in five regional centres in Queensland (JCU Cairns, CQU Mackay and Gladstone, USC Sippy Downs and USQ Hervey Bay)
  - high bandwidth links between the AREN and Murdoch University's three campuses at South Street, Rockingham and Mandurah
  - AREN Regional Light Up
- 2.5 Gbit/s backbone network from Brisbane to James Cook University in Townsville
- South Australian Broadband Research and Education Network (SABRENet)
- AARNet
  - improved broadband access from University of Wollongong to Sydney
  - 155 Mbit/s link between Adelaide and Charles Darwin University
  - Contribution towards the cost of access from Australian Maritime College
  - Dual 10 Gbit/s transpacific link to carry research and education traffic for an initial period of five years
- 1 Gb inter-university network in Adelaide over the Electricity Trust of South Australia bandwidth for 15 years
- provide access to two fibre pairs on the Nextgen Networks for the Australian higher education sector and wider research community

== FRODO projects ==
In 2003, ARIIC funded four Federated Repositories of Online Digital Objects (FRODO) projects :

- Australian Partnership for Sustainable Repositories (APSR)
- Meta Access Management System Project (MAMS)
- Australian Research Repositories Online to the World (ARROW)
- Australian Digital Theses Program Expansion (ADT)

== MERRI projects ==
On 22 August 2005 the Hon Dr Brendan Nelson announced funding for nine projects collectively known as the Managed Environments for Research Repository Infrastructure (MERRI) projects, involving over 30 Australian universities. The funded projects are:

- BlueNet: Australian Marine Science Data Network
- Time Sync: Mapping the Global Financial System
- Molecular Medicine Informatics Model (MMIM): A Multi-Institutional, Multi-disciplinary Research and Training Platform for Clinical Research
- Australian Service for Knowledge of Open Source Software (ASK-OSS)
- Middleware Action Plan and Strategy (MAPS)
- Open Access to Knowledge (OAK-LAW) (Legal Protocols for Copyright Management: Facilitating Open Access to Research at the National and International Levels (LPCM))
- EFR: e-Security Framework for Research, University of Queensland
- Regional Universities Building Research Infrastructure Collaboratively (RUBRIC)
