= Domainz =

Former registry operator in New Zealand

- Founded: April 15, 1997
- Defunct: November 2003
- Fate: Acquired by Webcentral

Domainz Limited is a former domain name registrar and web host company, known as the original .nz registry operator.

In September 2003, Domainz was acquired by Australian-based registrar Webcentral (then Melbourne IT Limited).

== History ==
IANA delegated the .nz namespace to John Houlker on 19 January 1987, and the University of Waikato issued .nz domain names and maintained the .nz registry during the early part of Internet availability in New Zealand.

During 1996, as Internet use was flourishing in New Zealand, and operation of the .nz registry was becoming burdensome on the University of Waikato, John Houlker, IANA and The Internet Society of New Zealand (Isocnz) agreed to a redelegation of the .nz name to Isocnz. The University of Waikato was contracted to continue hosting the .nz namespace until Isocnz was in a position to assume full responsibility for the Domain Name System (DNS).

Isocnz established a subsidiary company, “The New Zealand Internet Registry Ltd”, trading as Domainz, to run the .nz registry, on 15 April 1997. Domainz commenced allocating domain names, to both companies and individuals, evolving what was known as the Domainz Registration System (DRS).

Concern over a new online registry system, which was facing numerous problems, and opposition to a lawsuit (against Alan Brown, the founder of ORBS) were both championed by Domainz CEO Patrick O'Brien. This saw all available Isocnz council seats (and subsequently the Domainz board) filled by "rebel" members in elections in July 2000.

The SRS was implemented and became live on 14 October 2002, with Domainz as the sole registrar, acting in a stabilizing role, until the first competitive registrar connected to the shared registry on 7 December 2002.

Domainz remained as the stabilizing registrar until September 2003, when it was acquired by Webcentral for $A1.5 million.

== References and sources ==
- History from New Zealand Commerce Commission (PDF)
