= Snap Send Solve =

Smart cities technology platform

Snap Send Solve Pty Ltd
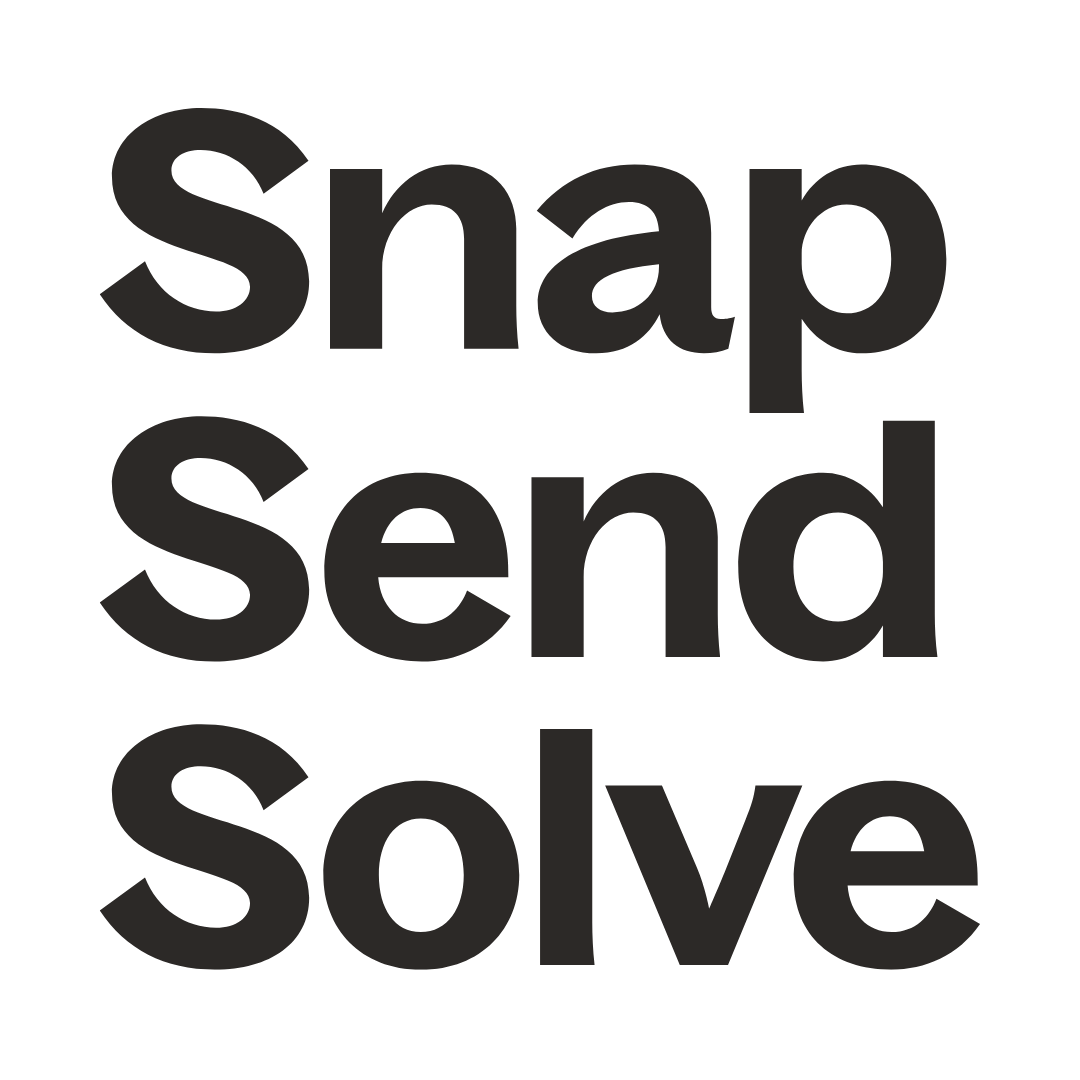
- Trade name: Snap Send Solve
- Industry: Software Development
- Founded: 2010
- Headquarters: Melbourne, Australia
- Area served: Australia and New Zealand
- Website: https://www.snapsendsolve.com

Snap Send Solve is a smart cities technology platform that aims to simplify the reporting of community issues in Australia and New Zealand.

Snap Send Solve is a privately owned Australia technology company headquartered in Melbourne.

== History ==
Snap Send Solve was created in 2010 as an entry for the App My State by Outware Mobile (now known as Arq Group) as part of a Victorian Government open-data hackathon. The idea for the app was inspired by the founder, Danny Gorog who was frustrated by how hard it was to report a broken swing in a park. The app won a 2013 Melbourne Design Award.

Originally, the free platform only allowed for reporting to every council in Australia however after a request from South East Water, the platform was expanded to include other authorities who have assets in the public domain such as water authorities, telecommunication and power authorities. Since then other authorities and organisations have been added to the platform such as universities, other Government departments such as Agriculture Victoria, Wildlife Victoria and housing communities.

In 2015, Snap Send Solve was featured in an article in Government News by Maris Sansom titled 'Apps change the face of government' that outlines how apps such as Snap Send Solve are helping Councils save money by moving to more efficient channels. There are many other digital platforms that councils are adopting to help manage this transition.

In 2016 Snap Send Solve entered a commercial agreement with Christchurch City Council in New Zealand. Christchurch City Council entered the app into the ALGIM Web and Digital Symposium where it won the 'Best Use of Social Media/App'. Since 2016 it has been adopted by other councils and authorities in New Zealand including Waimakariri District Council, Selwyn District Council, Ashburton District Council and Canterbury Regional Council.

== Awards ==
- 2020 Gold Driven x Design Awards: Snap Send Solve received Gold for their user experience, innovative design and seamless platform experience for users.
- 2023 Gold Good Design Award for Digital Design: Apps and Software: Snap Send Solve received this award as recognition for their innovative digital design in the apps and software category.
- 2023 Green Good Design Award for Social Impact: Snap Send Solve received this award for their socially conscious design, focusing on real-world challenges and enhancing community interaction.

== Partnerships and Community Usage ==
Usage of Snap Send Solve by the community has grown over time. In 2018, it was reported that councils in New South Wales received 14,758 reports for parking issues. In January 2020 it was reported that Victorians had made 104,164 reports using Snap Send Solve, with the most popular incident categories being rubbish, graffiti and parking.

Snap Send Solve is featured and recommended as an official contact method of many councils and other authorities around Australia and New Zealand including:

- Cotton Australia
  - Cotton Australia partnered with Snap Send Solve to address spray drift affecting cotton crops. Snap Send Solve provided a platform for cotton farmers to document and report spray drift incidents.
- Ipswich City Council
  - The City of Ipswich in an effort to make reporting to council a breeze, has worked with Snap Send Solve to include Snap Send Solve branding a downloadable QR code on council rates notice envelopes.
- Noosa Council
  - Noose Council has partnered with Snap Send Solve to introduce QR codes on dog waste bag dispensers. Simplifying the process for residents to request a dispenser refill with just a quick scan.
- Yarra Valley Water
  - Yarra Valley Water, the largest water corporation in Melbourne, embedded the Snap Send Solve webform onto their website. Resulting in reduced pressure on phone lines for emergencies, streamlined online reports, and helped prioritise work orders for non-critical issues.
- Hume City Council
  - Hume City Council focused on improving the satisfaction of their customer service officers and customers by partnering with Snap Send Solve and implementing small changes before fully integrating their systems. The council has been saving up to 2 minutes of processing time per report from day 1 of the partnership.
- The City of Port Phillip
  - The City of Port Phillip enabled end-to-end integration with Snap Send Solve and Technology One, since the integration they have saved an average of 23 business days annually in processing time.
- Whitehorse City Council
- Monash City Council
- Sutherland Shire Council
- City of Kalgoorlie Boulder
- University of Melbourne
- Bundaberg Regional Council
- Fraser Coast Regional Council
- Noosa Shire Council
- Rockhampton Regional Council
- Christchurch City Council
- Telstra
- Sydney Water
- Brisbane Council
- Manningham Council

The apps use of geo-location means it can also be used for other novel purposes such as reporting of injured Australian wildlife to Wildlife Victoria and potential infestations of phylloxera to Agriculture Victoria.

== Usage Statistics ==
In 2024, Snap Send Solve reached just over 4.5 million reports of varying community issues. Snap Send Solve as a platform currently hosts 850 plus ‘Solvers’, from local councils to water authorities, telecommunication providers, power authorities and private businesses. With over 700,000 app downloads and 550,00 active users, the app maintains an average app rating of 4.7 stars.

At the end of 2023, Snap Send Solve released their yearly wrapped data, breaking down the incidents and states behind the over 1 million reports they received during the year. With more than half a million reports coming from Victorian users, the state mainly focused on reporting issues with rubbish and bins, parking, trees and abandoned trolleys.

== Commercial Model ==
Snap Send Solve provides a free basic service to all Councils in Australia and New Zealand who can receive reports from the public that include images, geolocation details and reporter details. The company has been working with the MAV to create a paid Enterprise service that provides access to a reporting API and additional report customisation options.

== Software as a service ==
Snap Send Solve is a software as a service (SaaS) business and charges an annual license fee for the paid, Enterprise service.

== App Features ==
- Report Timeline: Offers app users a consolidated view of their Snap Send Solve report updates, including updates to progress status and reference number updates.
- Ability to report from home: The Snap Send Solve app empowers users to conveniently report issues from anywhere with internet access. If there’s no time to finish a Snap when an issue is spotted, users can easily finish their Snap later.
- Reassign for Solvers: Occasionally Snap Send Solve reports are sent to the wrong Solver. To solve this, all Solvers on the Snap Send Solve platform can access and use the Reassign feature in the Snap Send Solve portal to reassign Snap Send Solve reports to the correct authority.
- Private Reporting Mode: Allows organisations to access the Snap Send Solve platform and present custom incident types that cannot be accessed or seen by the general public. Private Reporting Mode can only be accessed by users who have an Access Code.
- Report ratings: Allows Snap Send Solve users to provide feedback on their ‘Solve’, including rating the overall experience, communication from the Solver, satisfaction with the solve, and speed to solve.
- Sending a Nudge: A nudge is a follow-up in the app, asking a ‘Solver’ for an update on a Snap Send Solve report.
- Sharing a Snap: The ability to share a Snap Send Solve report, sharing a Snap Send Solve report will create a URL to view the report that can then be shared in private messages, Facebook posts, public forums, or anywhere where a URL can be shared.
- Refer a friend: Refer friends and family to the Snap Send Solve app by sharing a custom referral link. App users can even receive a badge for referring 3 friends to Snap Send Solve.
