= KRE =

KRE may mean:

- 1400 KVTO, an AM radio station, Berkeley, California, US, call sign KRE 1922-1986
- 102.9 KBLX-FM, an FM radio station, Berkeley, California, US, call sign KRE-FM 1949-1979
- Kirundo Airport, Burundi, IATA airport code
- North Korea, ITU country code
- kre; pseudonym of Kevin Robert Elz
