= Geoff Huston =

Geoff Huston may refer to:

- Geoff Huston (basketball), American basketball player
- Geoff Huston (scientist), Australian scientist
