= EIPR =

EIPR may refer to:

- Egyptian Initiative for Personal Rights, an independent Egyptian human rights organization
- European Intellectual Property Review, a monthly law review
