= Alpana Roy =

New Zealand professor of law

Academic background
- Education: University of Sydney, University of Technology Sydney
- Thesis: A postcolonial analysis of intellectual property law

Alpana Roy is a New Zealand legal academic, and is a full professor of law at the University of Waikato, specializing in the law on intellectual property and information technology, and alternative dispute resolution, including online dispute resolution. She is an accredited mediator, and works in practice and as a legal consultant. She is the Dean of the Waikato Law School.

== Academic career ==
Roy became interested in social justice and law during her childhood, saying "My father would often discuss the lives and times of leaders such as Gandhi, Mandela, Lincoln – and they often had studied law!". Roy also holds a Bachelor of Arts in Social Science and a Master of Arts in Journalism from the University of Technology Sydney, and a Bachelor of Law with Honours from the University of Sydney.

Roy completed a PhD titled A postcolonial analysis of intellectual property law at the University of Sydney in 2006. She practiced as a barrister at the New South Wales bar in 2008/2009. Roy held academic positions at a number of Australian universities, including Western Sydney University, where she was Associate Dean of Research at the School of Law, and University of Queensland, the University of Technology Sydney, the University of Sydney and Charles Sturt University. Roy joined the faculty of the University of Waikato in 2020, being appointed as a full professor and Dean of the Law School. In addition to her academic roles, Roy works in legal practice and as a legal consultant. She was elected to the council of InternetNZ in 2022.

Roy's research focuses on intellectual property and information technology, covering such areas as the law around domain names, Indigenous and traditional knowledge, and dispute resolution mechanisms. In 2009, Roy became an accredited mediator, having had her interest in alternative dispute resolution sparked due to the benefits that can be obtained to all parties (including courts) when disputes are resolved earlier. Her interests extend to online dispute resolution, particularly in relation to the UDRP and auDRP. Roy's book on Australian domain name law, published in 2016, has been described as "the international authority in the area because it is the first authoritative study anywhere in the world to critically examine Australian domain name law."

== Selected works ==
- Alpana Roy (2016). Australian domain name law. Pyrmont, New South Wales: LawBook Co. ISBN 9780455231068
- Rocque Reynolds, Natalie Stoianoff, Alpana Roy. (2015) Intellectual Property: Text and Essential Cases. The Federation Press. Fifth edition. ISBN 9781862879867
- Mark Perry, Alpana Roy, Melissa de Zwart, Michael Adams, Niloufer Selvadurai, Heather Forrest, Monique Cormier, Simon McKenzie (2022) Legal issues in Information Technology. Thomson Reuters. ISBN 9780455245140
- Alpana Roy; Althaf Marsoof (2016). "A Critical and Comparative Review of auDRP and UDRP Domain Name Decisions". The Journal of World Intellectual Property. 19 (5–6): 203–237. doi:10.1111/jwip.12059. Wikidata Q126122484.
- Alpana Roy; Althaf Marsoof (2018). "A critical review of the Australian approach to tackling online copyright infringement". European Intellectual Property Review. 40 (1): 41–48. ISSN 0142-0461. Wikidata Q126122502.
- Alpana Roy; Althaf Marsoof (2017). "Geo-blocking, VPNs and Injunctions". European Intellectual Property Review. 39 (11): 672–680. hdl:8081/1959.7/uws:44092. Wikidata Q126122532.
