= Kevin Robert Elz =

Australian computer scientist

Kevin Robert Elz, often referred to in computing circles as Robert Elz, or simply kre, is a computer programmer and a pioneer in connecting Australia to the Internet, and more recently, in connecting Thailand.

== Career ==
Some of his achievements include developing a number of important Internet RFC documents, helping connect Australia to the world-wide Internet, developing the internet-based research network within Australia, and operating the .au domain registry from 1986 through to the late 1990s. He also managed the aus.* Usenet hierarchy from its inception in the 1980s until the mid-1990s. In the early 1980s he contributed to the operation of the Australian Computer Science network (ACSnet originally developed by Bob Kummerfeld and Piers Dick-Lauder University of Sydney) and in 1989 with Torben Nielsen of the University of Hawaiʻi he completed the connection work that brought the internet to Australia, which enabled AARNet to develop soon after.

He is an Honorary Fellow at the University of Melbourne, where for some years he worked in the Computer Science department. Elz has been a NetBSD developer since 2016.

An ardent cricket fan, Elz is also credited for pioneering online text commentary for cricket matches.

Having previously lived and worked in Melbourne for many years, he currently lives in Hat Yai, Songkhla, Thailand, where he is an honorary lecturer in the Computer Engineering Department of the Prince of Songkla University.

== Operation of .com.au ==
As the architect of the early domain-name eligibility criteria for ".com.au", Elz was largely responsible for Australia's not experiencing a domain name gold rush in the mid-1990s. The eligibility policy required a direct connection between a company's official name and its domain name, in contrast to the strictly first-come-first-served policy of the .com registry.

Elz was, however, criticised during his tenure, as domain name applications often took many months to be examined, despite the commercialisation of the Internet and customer demands for quick turnaround times. In 1990, Elz delegated responsibility for the ".gov.au" and ".edu.au" domains to Geoff Huston at the Australian National University. Elz handed the operation of ".com.au" to Melbourne IT in 1996. Responsibility for other domains was transferred to auDA in 2001.
