= .kiwi =

Internet top-level domain

- Introduced: 25 November 2013
- TLD type: GeoTLD
- Status: Active
- Registry: Dot Kiwi Ltd. (operated by InternetNZ)
- Sponsor: Dot Kiwi Ltd.
- Intended use: Entities connected with New Zealand
- DNSSEC: Yes
- Registry website: https://hello.kiwi/

.kiwi is an Internet generic top-level domain with emphasis on New Zealand. It employs the colloquial term kiwi, used to refer to New Zealanders.

As of January 2024 there are just under 11,000 registered .kiwi domains, connected to 8,633 active websites.

== History ==
Dot Kiwi Limited reportedly spent a "seven-figure" sum securing the new top level domain from the Internet Corporation for Assigned Names and Numbers (ICANN).

The domain launched with a 'landrush' period in March 2014 after two years of planning.

In May 2014, shortly after launch, 4,600 .kiwi domains had been activated. As at the first anniversary on 1 May 2015, 12,000 .kiwi domains had been registered. Dot Kiwi Limited claimed that this meant .kiwi was in the top 25 per cent of new domains released by ICANN.

The .kiwi top level domain is not to be confused with .kiwi.nz, which launched as a new option under the .nz top level domain in August 2012.

The technical backend was originally provided by the Canadian Internet Registration Authority's Fury product. In 2024, InternetNZ signed a contract with Dot Kiwi Ltd. to provide registry and registrar support services for the domain.
