= Open Relay Behavior-modification System =

Open Relay Behavior-modification System (ORBS), created and run by Alan Brown in New Zealand, was one of the first DNS-based Blackhole Lists (DNSBL), a means by which an internet domain may publish a list of IP addresses, in a database which can be easily queried automatically by other computer programs on the Internet. The ORBS list was used to blacklist IP addresses that were open mail relays, third-party mail servers through which spammers can relay their messages and thus attempt to obfuscate the source of the spam.

== Controversy ==
The ORBS list was controversial for a number of reasons. Many people felt that the methods ORBS employed to scan the Internet for open mail servers could be abusive. ORBS used probes to test for open relays without permission, sometimes over and over again. Some claimed that testing of their networks continued even after they asked ORBS to stop, others claimed that relayed spam didn't stop either. In some cases the tests interfered with mail servers, causing delays, especially when those servers were assigned hundreds of IP addresses.

Related to the testing regime, which was excessive in the eyes of a number of email administrators, Brown's policy of adding servers he was unable to test to the list, whether or not they were actually open relays, was also a matter of dispute. Another complaint was that open relays that had never sent spam were listed without notice. False listings on ORBS were also alleged, particularly when Brown was engaged in legal or other dispute against the listed party

A website was created in 2001 by Brad Baker called stoporbs.org, to offer assistance to other mail administrators who had been listed on the ORBS blacklist for reasons other than open relays. Many administrators felt that by listing servers for other than the reasons advertised (open relays), the list was not reliable for the supposed purpose.

== Lawsuits ==
ORBS was created and run by Alan Brown in New Zealand. It was shut down in 2001 due to Brown's health and money issues and two lawsuits brought by companies listed on ORBS, Xtra and Actrix, which he had refused to remove. The companies were listed by ORBS because they blocked its probes and they kept relaying spam. Brown was forced to sell his Internet service provider, Manawatu Internet Services, to cover expenses, and to state that the companies had been listed inappropriately.

Brown also had a defamation lawsuit brought against him, O'Brien v Brown. The court ruled that Brown made defamatory comments about Patrick O'Brien, CEO of Domainz, which is the .nz domain registrar. The comments were made in the Domainz discussion group. When Brown was offered a chance to apologize, he made additional defamatory comments. Following O'Brien's victory and the awarding of $42,000 to him, Brown claimed that his net worth was only $500, which he said is why he did not have a lawyer

== Aftermath ==
Several groups had cached the lists, retested the open relays, and replaced ORBS. Running an open relay became even a bigger problem than before. DNSBLs listing open relays got so effective that spammers shifted to insecure proxy servers.

The Internet Society of New Zealand council seats (and subsequently the Domainz board) were filled by "rebel" members in elections in July 2000. O'Brien departed to run Singapore's Internet registry.
