= Webcentral =

Australian digital services company

- Formerly: Melbourne IT Group
- Type: Private
- Industry: Software & Services
- Founded: 1996
- Founder: University of Melbourne
- Headquarters: Melbourne, Australia
- Number of locations: Sydney, Melbourne, Brisbane
- Area served: Australia, New Zealand & Worldwide
- Services: Domain registrar; Web hosting; SSL certificate; Email & office apps; Website design; Lead generation; Facebook & Google advertising; Cloud service; Managed services; 5G network; Dark fibre; Government cloud; Secure Internet Gateway; Cyber security; Data center; IT services; DevOps; DevOps security
- Number of employees: 350
- Divisions: www.melbourneit.com.au; www.melbourneit.com.au/dps; www.netregistry.com.au; www.domainz.net.nz
- Website: www.webcentral.au/corporate/

Webcentral is an Australian digital services provider, founded in 1996 as Melbourne Information Technology International, a commercial subsidiary of the University of Melbourne. The company provides internet domain registration, email/office applications, cloud hosting, cloud services, and managed services. It is a publicly traded company, that was listed on the Australian Securities Exchange in December 1999.

== History ==
=== Beginnings ===
Webcentral's history dates back to April 1996 when Eugene Falk and Professor Peter Gerrand were appointed as chairman and CEO, respectively, for the University of Melbourne's new commercial subsidiary Melbourne Information Technology International, which commenced operations from 1 May 1996. Professor Iain Morrison was appointed the third foundation director of the company. The company chose to trade under the business name of Melbourne IT from its earliest days.

The company's charter was to demonstrate the university's strategic leadership in working with industry and government in selected areas of IT. Its first and continuingly profitable business, up until its float on the Australian Securities Exchange in December 1999, was its joint venture ASAC (Advanced Services Applications Centre) with Ericsson Australia. ASAC was set up to develop applications with synergies between the Internet and advanced telecommunications, particularly mobile products. ASAC was recognised by Ericsson as one of its Global Design Centres in 1997 and contributed $0.5 million in profit to Melbourne IT in the year before its float. ASAC was incorporated as an independent joint venture in December 2000, but became a casualty of Ericsson's downsizing of its global R&D following the bursting of the Dot-com bubble in July 2000.

On 21 June 1996 a front-page article in the Australian Financial Review (AFR) by Charles Wright drew attention to the parlous state of commercial domain name registration in Australia, where a large backlog of Australian businesses was waiting for the processing of their applications for com.au domain names by the part-time domain name administrator, Robert Elz, senior system administrator in the University of Melbourne's Computer Science Department, who declined to communicate with the media.

Robert Elz had been assigned the role of administrator of the .au top-level domain by Jon Postel since 1986, an arrangement that worked quite satisfactorily through the early 1990s when the Internet was largely of interest only to tertiary education and research institutions. The AFR article caused Melbourne University to be aware of the possible commercial value of the rights to assign domain names, but also of the damage to the university's reputation if the registration of com.au domain names was not transferred to a competent commercial organization. The Head of the Computer Science Department persuaded Elz to transfer the administration of com.au names to the University's subsidiary Melbourne IT, which he did by way of a non-exclusive license, to be reviewed after five years. Melbourne IT was awarded a grant of $100,000 by the Government of Victoria in 1996 in return for registering the backlog of over 2,000 com.au applications free to the applicants, and used this money to build its first domain name registration software platform.

From October 1996 Melbourne IT began pricing its services by charging for new and renewed com.au names at 10% below the market rate set by Network Solutions for the popular.com names and was the first domain name registrar worldwide to introduce trademark checking and money-back service assurance guarantees. It also introduced three-tiered pricing for different levels of turnaround time, during the first two years 1997-98 before eligibility decisions were sped up by online access to the Australian trademarks database and to registries of Australian business names and gazetted geographical names. Melbourne IT also moved to align to Robert Elz's rather idiosyncratic eligibility criteria (e.g., ‘no name should in principle be registered if found in an English dictionary; but exceptions had been made to this before 1996 such as news.com.au and travel.com.au, which annoyed other applicants to the rules for registering business names in Australia).

In April 1999, Melbourne IT was selected by ICANN to be one of the first five registrars to register.com, .net and.org names in competition with the incumbent Network Solutions. Entry into the international domain name market from July 1999 greatly increased the company's revenues and market value, and caused the University to prepare the company for an initial public offering. On 14 December 1999, Melbourne IT was floated on the ASX, near the height of the dot-com bubble.

It benefited from a cover story by finance journalist Ivor Rees in a weekend edition of the Australian Financial Review in November 1999, describing it presciently as the ‘Hottest Float of the Year. Interest in the shares was particularly strong because it was the only Australian tech stock floating that year with a track record of actual profitability. Demands for a prospectus were so high that complaints were aired in the media by members of the public unable to obtain one. The chief beneficiaries of the float were the clients of the underwriters, JBWere and CommSec, some of whom made massive stag profits when the stock peaked at $8.20 on the day of its float, compared with the IPO price of $2.20. In 2000 the Victorian Auditor-General held an investigation into whether the stock was undervalued by the underwriters when listed, but concluded that the float had been carried out properly.

=== 2000s ===
The University of Melbourne received a gross benefit of $93.5 million through selling 85% of its equity in the float, as well as a pre-float dividend of $1 million, but left the company with $7.5 million as working capital. The stock held up above $8 for four months following the dot-com bubble of April 2000, peaking briefly at $17 in February, but sank to $5.99 after the company released a realistic market outlook on 23 August 2000.

During January to August 2000 the founding CEO Peter Gerrand founded subsidiaries in the US and Europe, and participated in the creation of auDA as the national domain name industry self-regulator. On 14 September he announced he would leave the company on 30 September for family reasons; after this announcement the stock sank by a further 10%. He was succeeded by his deputy Adrian Kloeden, and continued as a consultant to the company until after the hosting of ICANN's meeting in Melbourne in March 2001. Adrian Kloeden was succeeded as CEO by Theo Hnarakis in November 2002.

In September 2006, Melbourne IT acquired the Australian Internet hosting company, WebCentral Group (ASX:WCG) via a scheme of arrangement and delisted the WebCentral group from the ASX. Founded in 1997, WCG has 2 data centres in Brisbane, one at Wickham Street, Fortitude Valley, and another in Spring Hill at a PIPE Networks facility. Staff from Webcentral's Brisbane office also manage a large colocation area in an Equinix datacentre in Mascot, New South Wales.

Dr Bruce Tonkin, who joined Melbourne IT in 1999 as Chief Technology Officer, was elected convenor of ICANN's GNSO (Generic Names Support Organization) constituency from June 2004 to June 2007, and will serve on the ICANN Boards as the GNSO's elected representative from May 2008.

=== 2010s ===
On 23 December 2011, Melbourne IT accidentally leaked the details of more than 28,000 customers.

On 30 July 2012, Melbourne IT servers were hacked by the internet group Anonymous.

MelbourneIT was also a new gTLD consultancy, and the week of January 2012, which was the launch of ICANN's new gTLD application period, it announced that it had been working with over 100 applications on behalf of various clients. Melbourne IT also noted that many of its clients are Fortune 500 companies or associated with the Association of National Advertisers (ANA). The latter fact is particularly noteworthy given the fact that ANA had led a high-profile anti-gTLD expansion campaign following the approval of the program, and was successful in achieving multiple hearings in the U.S. Congress and other anti-TLD expansion forums and press.

In February 2012, one of the first public Brand TLD ventures, StarHub, announced that it had partnered with MelbourneIT's Digital Brand Services to help apply for and manage its proposed Starhub TLD. Later that month, Melbourne IT revealed that they were currently working on 120 new gTLD applications and that they expected to bring that number to 150 before the application window closed in just over a month. It was also announced that MelbourneIT was working as new gTLD consultants with the governments of the Australian states of Victoria and New South Wales, and with ARI Registry Services, to prepare bids for Melbourne, Sydney, and Victoria. The company ended up handling 148 applications, approximately a quarter of which came from Australian clients.

On 29 August 2013, Melbourne IT CEO Theo Hnarakis announced that the Syrian Electronic Army had attacked the New York Times website by tricking people managing the New York Times DNS domain as a reseller of Melbourne IT to disclose their login credentials in a targeted phishing attack.

On 27 February 2014, Melbourne IT announced the acquisition of their rival NetRegistry Group for $50.4 million.

On 17 December 2014, Websites and emails were knocked offline by a botched migration. At the time of writing both had been offline for over a month with outages continuing.

On 10 June 2015, Melbourne IT acquired 50.2% of Outware Mobile for $21.7 million Outware Mobile was founded in 2009 and quickly grew to one of the largest app development companies in Australia. Outwear designed and developed some of the most used apps in Australia, including AFL Live, NRL Live, and Cricket Live.

On 25 February 2015, Melbourne IT revealed plans to buy Uber Global for $15.5 million.

On 16 March 2016, Melbourne IT acquired InfoReady for $15 million from Tristan Sternson.

On 17 February 2017, Melbourne IT acquired the remaining 24.9% of Outware Mobile for $26.9 million from Eytan Lenko, Gideon Kowadlo and Danny Gorog. All three founders exited the business and have started their own ventures, including the software business Snap Send Solve.

In May 2017, Melbourne IT acquired WME Group for approximately AU$39 million(US$39 million).

On 28 May 2018, Melbourne IT Group officially rebranded as Arq Group.

=== 2020s ===
On 28 May 2020, Arq Group rebranded as Webcentral Group.

In July 2021, it was announced that 5G Networks would become a subsidiary of Webcentral in October or November 2021, subject to approvals.
