= NetHui =

Internet-related conference in New Zealand

NetHui Conference
- Status: Active
- Genre: Internet
- Frequency: Annually
- Country: New Zealand
- Inaugurated: 2011
- Most recent: 13–14 October 2020 (online)
- Organizer: InternetNZ
- Website: https://nethui.nz

NetHui is a New Zealand conference about internet governance and policy issues. First held in 2011, it is organised by InternetNZ and brings together the country's internet community to discuss the issues shaping web use in New Zealand.

== About ==
NetHui is organised by InternetNZ and was first held in 2011. It brings together people from business, government, civil society and the technical and academic sectors to talk about topical issues, challenges, and opportunities the internet brings to New Zealand.

Each conference has a theme, with one or more keynote speakers and sessions with opportunities for discussion and debate. It has been held at various locations around the country, with sessions live streamed and recorded. Often there is also live-chat and collaborative online notes facilities available.

A NetHui is about discussions, not presentations – participants set topics and lead conversations among all of the attendees. While there are plenary sessions with keynote speakers to bring participants together at the beginning and end of each day, most of a NetHui is dedicated to breakout sessions, often with multiple sessions running concurrently. This format deliberately creates smaller groups so more voices can be heard.

== Conferences ==
=== NetHui 2011 ===
NetHui 2011 was held from 29 June to 1 July 2011 at the SkyCity Convention Centre in Auckland. The theme was Shaping the future together.

=== NetHui 2012 ===
NetHui 2012 was held from 11 to 13 July at the SkyCity Convention Centre in Auckland. It included a discussion on "Building online Te Reo and other multilingual content".

==== NetHuiSouth 2012 ====
NetHuiSouth 2012 was held from 23 to 24 November at Otago University and Otago Museum in Dunedin.

=== NetHui 2013 ===
NetHui 2012 was held from 8–10 July at the Wellington Town Hall. Hon Amy Adams, Minister for Communications and Information Technology delivered a keynote address. The International Keynote was given by Quinn Norton.

=== NetHui 2014 ===
NetHui 2014 was held from 9–11 July at the SkyCity Convention Centre in Auckland. The theme was The next 25 years. Sessions covered the current role of the internet in the country and the future for it in the next 25 years. Deputy Prime Minister of New Zealand Bill English opened NetHui 2014. Differing from previous years, speakers and sessions were live-streamed to maximise participation. A keynote address was by Privacy Commissioner John Edwards where he discussed a recent Spanish court ruling on Google and the right to be forgotten. Hon Amy Adams, Communications and Information Technology Minister also gave a keynote address.

==== NetHuiSouth 2014 ====
NetHuiSouth was held from 21 to 22 November in Christchurch.

=== NetHui 2015 ===
NetHui 2015 was held from 8–10 July at the SkyCity Convention Centre in Auckland. The theme was The Internet Is Everybody’s Business. Hon Amy Adams Communications Minister gave a keynote address.

=== NetHui 2016 ===
NetHui 2016 was held as three one-day regional events in Nelson on the 13th of October, in South Auckland on the 15th of October, and in Rotorua on the 17th of October.

=== NetHui 2017 ===
NetHui 2017 was held from 9–10 November at Auckland's Aotea Centre. The theme was Trust and Freedom on the Internet.

=== NetHui 2018 ===
NetHui 2018 was held as three one-day regional events in the Manawatū on the 5th October at the Palmerston North Conference and Functions Centre, the West Coast on 11 October at the Tai Poutini Polytechnic, Greymouth, and in Southland on 16 October at the Ascot Park Hotel, Invercargill.

=== NetHui 2019 ===
NetHui 2019 was held from 3–4 October at Te Papa in Wellington.

=== NetHui 2020 ===
NetHui 2020 was held online from 13 to 14 October.
