= AusRegistry =

- Industry: Internet
- Area served: Australia
- Services: Domain registration
- Number of employees: 75+
- Website: www.ausregistry.com.au

AusRegistry was a Melbourne, Australia based company that specialised in domain name registry services.

AusRegistry was the registry operator and wholesale provider for all commercial .au (Australian) domain names including .com.au and .net.au and the non-commercial domain names .edu.au and .gov.au - for over 16 years, from 2002 until 1 July 2018. It doesn't provide any services to the general public.

In 2002, after an open tender, AusRegistry was awarded a four-year contract to operate the domain name registry for auDA. In 2005, after another open tender, AusRegistry was once again selected to be the registry operator for a second four-year period commencing on 1 July 2006. Controversially, in February 2009 auDA announced that it had extended its .au Registry Licence Agreement with Ausregistry until 2014 without a tender bid.

A 2012 report found that 99% of registered domains were within the .com.au, .net.au and .org.au spaces.

AusRegistry's TLD registry is compliant with the latest Extensible Provisioning Protocol (EPP) standards and was one of the first to offer rapid DNS updating in ccTLD zone files.

AusRegistry International is a subsidiary of AusRegistry that provides domain name registry services outside of Australia and other registry services.

AusRegistry previously operated the Renewable Energy Certificates Registry under contract to the Office of the Renewable Energy Regulator (ORER) a statutory authority established to administer the Australian Government's Renewable Energy (Electricity) Act 2000. In 2005, AusRegistry International was awarded the tender to re-develop and manage the REC (Renewable Energy Certificate) Registry system until 2010. The REC registry currently manages over 13.5 million objects within stringent SLAs covering availability and response times.

In July 2015, Neustar Inc. announced the purchased of Bombora Technologies, the parent company of AusRegistry for $118.5 million.

In December 2016, it was announced that the private equity firm Golden Gate Capital would acquire Neustar Inc. for about $2.9 billion. Singapore's sovereign wealth fund GIC Private Ltd is involved in the deal and will a minority owner in Neustar Inc.

In December 2017, auDA announced that after 16 years of running the .AU registry, AusRegistry lost a competitive tender process to Afilias, who would take over the running of the .AU registry on 1 July 2018.

== See also ==
- Internet in Australia
