= .hm =

Internet country code top-level domain for the Heard and McDonald Islands

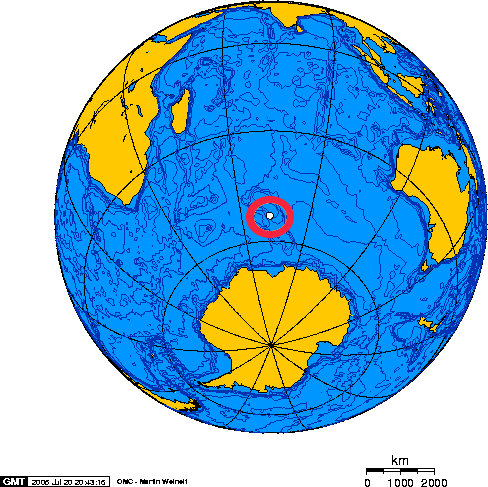
- Heard and McDonald Islands locator map
- Introduced: July 24, 1997; 28 years ago
- TLD type: Country code top-level domain
- Status: Active
- Registry: HM Domain Registry
- Sponsor: HM Domain Registry
- Intended use: Entities associated with Heard Island and McDonald Islands
- Actual use: Rare
- Registry website: www.registry.hm

.hm is the Internet country code top-level domain (ccTLD) of the Heard and McDonald Islands, uninhabited islands in the southern Indian Ocean under the sovereign control of Australia.

The .hm registry was added in July 1997. The Australian government, the only entity with any formal ties to the territory, does not use the domain, instead using .au, the domain for Australia, for the islands' official website. An Australian registrar, the HM Domain Registry (registry.hm), manages the domain and has opened it to outside registration. Any entity can register an .hm domain, with all domains directly registered at the second level.

The domain zone is being used by several websites related to Khanty-Mansiysk (Russia). Examples are a local engineering company Istok and Avto HM VK group's short link.
