= AARLIN =

Australian virtual research library project

AARLIN (Australian Academic Research Library Network) was a successful Australian project to develop "a national virtual research library system that will provide unmediated, personalized and seamless end-user access to the collections and resources of Australian libraries and document delivery services" and the federated search service and consortium that was the project outcome. It ceased operation at the end of 2010.

== History ==
In late 1999, the AARLIN project, led by La Trobe University, was funded by an Australian Research Council (ARC) grant of $250,000 through its Research Infrastructure Equipment and Facilities Scheme (RIEFS).

An additional $150,000 was contributed by the National Library of Australia and nineteen Australian university libraries.

The service continued operation until December 2010, with members choosing to operate the new generation of pre-indexed library search systems in house or as vendor hosted solutions.

== Pilot ==
Six Australian university libraries were involved in the pilot phase in 2001 and 2002:

- Flinders University
- Murdoch University
- La Trobe University
- Swinburne University
- University of Canberra
- Victoria University of Technology

== Operational phase ==
The AARLIN Project received $2.8 million from the DEST Systemic Infrastructure Initiative funding over three years 2002 to 2004. to implemented the system in participating Australian university libraries.

== Software ==
The AARLIN portal provided a simultaneous searching function, targeting OPACs, citation and fulltext databases, KINETICA, subject gateways, and other search engines. It also improved a user's access to fulltext data by deep linking to electronic resources or facilitating document delivery requests where appropriate.

The AARLIN project utilised two types of software, both produced by Ex Libris:

- MetaLib, front-end federated search software that enables searching across a range of resources
- SFX, an OpenURL link server that helps library patrons navigate to resources and services relevant to their search queries

The AARLIN Consortium was closely aligned with Metalib/SFX vendor Ex Libris Group, contributing heavily to their global user community and contributing features which would later be replicated and included into the main software packages.
