= .au =

Top-level Internet domain for Australia

- Introduced: 5 March 1986; 40 years ago
- TLD type: Country code top-level domain
- Status: Active
- Registry: Various
- Sponsor: .au Domain Administration (auDA)
- Intended use: Entities connected with Australia
- Actual use: Very popular in Australia
- Registered domains: 4,138,919 (10 December 2022)
- Registration restrictions: Limited to individuals, companies, and organisations located in Australia; different subdomains have various other restrictions. See .au Domain Administration Rules: Licensing (2019–01)
- Structure: Names may be registered at the third level within generic second-level categories; direct second-level registration allowed from 24 March 2022
- Documents: IANA report on redelegation; ICANN registry agreement
- Dispute policies: .au Dispute Resolution Policy (auDRP) (2016-01), .au Domain Administration Rules: Licensing (2019–01), Complaints Policy (2015-01), Complaints (Registrant Eligibility) Policy (2004-01)
- DNSSEC: Yes
- Registry website: auDA; Identity Digital Australia

.au is the Internet country code top-level domain (ccTLD) for Australia. It was created on 5 March 1986. Domain name policy is managed by .au Domain Administration (auDA).

== History ==
The domain name was originally allocated by Jon Postel, operator of the Internet Assigned Numbers Authority (IANA) to Kevin Robert Elz of Melbourne University in 1986.

After an approximately five-year process in the 1990s, the Internet industry created a self-regulatory body called .au Domain Administration (auDA) to operate the domain.

It obtained assent from ICANN in 2001, and commenced operating a new competitive regime for domain registration on 1 July 2002.

Since this new regime, any registration has to be ordered via a registrar.

== Operation ==
Oversight of .au is by auDA, a not-for-profit organisation whose membership is derived from Internet organisations, industry members and interested individuals.

The organisation operates with the endorsement of the Australian Government and with the delegated authority of ICANN.

Policy for .au is devised by policy development panels. These panels are convened by auDA and combine public input with industry representation to derive policy.

The day-to-day operation of the .au registry technical facility is tendered out by auDA.

AusRegistry has performed the registry role since the initial tender in 2002.

In December 2017, Afilias won a competitive tender process to take over the running of the registry from AusRegistry.

The registry does not sell domain registration services direct to the consumer, rather consumers who wish to register a domain must do so via a domain name registrar.

After the industry's liberalisation in 2002, there is an active competitive market in registrars with a variety of prices and services.

In 2008, auDA changed its longstanding policy and allowed changes in ownership of .au domains. Although the secondary market was initially slow to take off, there have recently been signs of increasing maturity in the .au aftermarket culminating in the record $125,500 sale of investmentproperty.com.au.

The auDA information security standard (ISS) is an industry initiative aimed at improving the security of .au registrar businesses, protecting .au registrants and enhancing the overall stability and integrity of the .au domain space.

auDA introduced the ISS in October 2013 as a mandatory requirement, with all accredited registrars required to be certified as ISS compliant within 24 months.

== Structure ==
The naming rules for .au require registrations under second-level categories that describe a type of entity. .com.au, for example, is designed for commercial entities. This follows a similar allocation policy to that formerly used in other countries such as the United Kingdom, Canada and New Zealand.

Registrations are currently permitted below a second-level domain, such as "yourname.com.au".

In April 2016, auDA announced it would introduce registrations directly at the second level, such as "yourname.au".

Direct registrations were due to be implemented in 2017, although an ongoing debate on how cybersquatting would be mitigated led to a delay, with a new launch date of 24 March 2022.

Registration of a .au domain is completed through a reseller, known as a registrar, with the registry acting as the wholesale provider. auDA manages domain name policy as the ICANN and Australian Government-endorsed manager of the .au DNS.

=== Second-level domains ===
Domain	Intended users	Notes
com.au	Commercial entities	N/A
net.au	Commercial entities	Historically only ISPs, but the use has been broadened
.org.au	Charities and non-profit organisations	Historically only for organisations that did not fit in other categories
.edu.au	Educational institutions	N/A
.gov.au	Governments and their departments	N/A
.asn.au	Incorporated associations	Examples include but are not limited to political parties, trade unions, sporting and special interest clubs
.id.au	Individuals	By real name or common alias
.csiro.au	CSIRO	Commonwealth Scientific and Industrial Research Organisation

The .edu.au, .gov.au and .csiro.au namespaces are referred to as "closed" namespaces, since registration is not available to the general public. All other second-level namespaces are referred to as "open" namespaces.

According to an annual report filed by .au Domain Association (auDA) in Q4 2022, one in six .au domains were a second-level domain.

=== .au Direct namespace ===
The direct second-level domain namespace, marketed as ".au Direct" has been made available to the public from 24 March 2022. The .au Direct namespace is intended to complement rather than replace the existing second-level domain namespaces and to provide domain holders with the option to register "shorter, simpler domain names".

Unlike the existing second-level domain namespaces, there is no restriction on the domain names that can be registered in the .au Direct namespace, provided the domain name applicant satisfies the Australian presence requirement.

In 2019, auDA released a priority implementation policy, whereby existing domain name holders could apply for priority registration of a matching domain name in the new .au Direct namespace. Three priority categories exist:

Category	Eligibility
Category 1	Holders of domain names created prior to 4 February 2018
Category 2	Holders of domain names created on or after 4 February 2018 but prior to 24 March 2022
General Availability	All other applicants

Eligible domain name holders could apply during an allocated sunrise period commencing 24 March 2022 until 20 September 2022.

For example, the holders of domain.com.au, domain.org.au and domain.net.au were each eligible to apply for priority registration of domain.au during the sunrise period.

If there were more than one priority application for a given domain name, priority is allocated as follows:

1. Category 1 applications had priority over Category 2 applications.
2. Where there are two or more Category 1 applications, priority was allocated by agreement between the respective holders, with allocation being placed on hold until consensus is reached or there is only one remaining Category 1 applicant.
3. Where there are two or more Category 2 applications, priority was allocated to the holder with the earliest creation date.

Any unclaimed domain names were released to general availability at the end of the sunrise period.

=== State and Territory Namespaces ===
Introduced in 2004, "community geographic domain names" (CGDNs), later renamed to "state and territory namespaces", are intended to be used for "community websites that reflect community interests such as local business, tourism, historical information, culture, sporting groups, local events and news" of a local community. These domains were initially managed by the .au Community Domains Trust (auCD) on behalf of auDA. The funding of auCD was provided from a ballot of locality names in the .com.au and .net.au domain spaces; previously, any locality with a postcode had been restricted from being registered as a commercial domain name.

CGDNs use the state or territory's common abbreviation as the second level of the domain. For example, a community based in Victoria would receive a domain ending in ".vic.au", a Northern Territory community would use ".nt.au", and so on. The third level of the domain must be an addressable locality within that state or territory, of the form "townname.vic.au". Where a name is duplicated within a state – for instance, between a smaller town, and a suburb of a larger town or city — the locality name may be suffixed with the name of the local government area, town or city to which it is associated (e.g. "suburbname-cityname.vic.au").

Holders of CGDNs must be "a legally registered, not-for-profit entity; and [...] representative of the local community for the purpose of holding the domain name licence." In particular, commercial entities and local governments are not permitted to hold a CGDN in their own right; they are however permitted to hold membership in such entities set up to hold a CGDN.

As of November 2009, the auCD site claims 91 active CGDNs across Australia, with a further 115 either approved or awaiting approval.

=== Third-level domains ===
The use of ".gov.au" as a second level domain is for Australian Federal government and for its initiatives, while the use of a third-level domain, being an Australian state abbreviation, is an identifier that the domain belongs to either the relevant state government or a local government inside the state. The ".edu.au" is also split up into state-based categories in most cases.

auDA has delegated responsibility of the .edu.au domain to Australian Information and Communications Technology in Education Committee (AICTEC), which formed a specialist sub-committee, .edu.au Domain Administration Committee (eDAC).

Schools use a domain name that reflect their locale, and these state-based third-level domains are managed independently by the states. For example, a school in Western Australia would register "schoolname.wa.edu.au". Similarly, replacing the state part of these domains, Victoria would use ".vic", Queensland would use ".qld", South Australia would use ".sa", Tasmania would use ".tas", Northern Territory would use ".nt" and the Australian Capital Territory would use ".act". However, after a change of internet services in Queensland State Schools their domain names were changed from "schoolname.qld.edu.au" to "schoolname.eq.edu.au" ("eq" is an abbreviation of the government department name "Education Queensland"). This is not the case for private schools in Queensland. Often, domains can even contain a fourth level: for instance, a NSW public school might have the domain "schoolname.schools.nsw.edu.au".

Tertiary institutions are typically exempt from requiring state-based distinctions. For example, Edith Cowan University in Western Australia has a domain of "ecu.edu.au" rather than "ecu.wa.edu.au", RMIT University in Victoria uses "rmit.edu.au" rather than "rmit.vic.edu.au". This difference can be associated with states having responsibility for primary and secondary education while the Commonwealth has responsibility for tertiary education; tertiary institutions often having a presence in multiple states.

State/organisation	Government abbreviation	School abbreviation
Australian Capital Territory	act.gov.au	act.edu.au
New South Wales	nsw.gov.au	schools.nsw.edu.au
Northern Territory	nt.gov.au	nt.edu.au
Queensland	qld.gov.au	eq.edu.au
South Australia	sa.gov.au	sa.edu.au
Tasmania	tas.gov.au	tas.edu.au
Victoria	vic.gov.au	vic.edu.au
Western Australia	wa.gov.au	wa.edu.au
Catholic Education System	N/A	catholic.edu.au

=== Historic second-level domains ===
Some second-level domain names are no longer actively used. Whilst registrations are grandfathered for some, no new registrations are accepted.

Domain	Users	Current status
.archie.au	Host of the Archie information service of the early 1990s	Deleted
.gw.au	Gateways and miscellaneous AARNet routing equipment	Deleted
.info.au	General information	Deleted
.otc.au	Mapping domain for X.400 addresses; was obsoleted by telememo.au	Deleted
.telememo.au	Mapping domain for X.400 addresses	Deleted
.conf.au	Conferences and other short-lived events	Only exists for linux.conf.au.
.oz.au	Historical domain name for Australian sites; later moved to .oz.au	In April 2011, many subdomains under cs.mu.oz.au and ee.mu.oz.au were still in use within the CSSE and EEE departments of the University of Melbourne. This continued until a restructure of the University of Melbourne changed the names of departments in 2018.

== Registration policies and rules ==
The .au domain namespace has strict licensing and eligibility requirements, compared to other gTLDs. This "policy rich" approach to the name space, begun by Robert Elz and continued by auDA, has meant the .au domain space has avoided the cybersquatting and fraudulent uses of domains prevalent in other more permissive domains.

auDA has been known to suspend or cancel domain registrations that potentially breach this policy in response to public outcry, such as when the Liberal Party redirected Albanese.com.au — the surname of Labor leader Anthony Albanese — to its own homepage during the 2022 Australian federal election campaign.

auDA maintains a set of formal published policies and rules which apply to all domains registered in the .au namespace.

=== Domain Name Eligibility and Allocation Policy Rules (2002 to 2021) ===
The Domain Name Eligibility and Allocation Policy Rules were first adopted in May 2002. Several revisions were subsequently introduced in 2005, 2008, and 2012 (subsequently updated in 2018).

Under the 2012 Eligibility Rules, registering a domain in the "open" .au namespace required that:

- the registrant must:
  - be an Australian organization or individual, the holder of an Australian trade mark, or a foreign company licensed to trade in Australia; and
  - conform to the specific registrant eligibility requirements the second-level domain; and
- the domain name must:
  - be an exact match, abbreviation, or acronym of the registrant's name or trade mark; or
  - have a "close and substantial connection" to the registrant.

=== auDA rules: Licensing (2021–present) ===
auDA adopted revised rules for domain names in 2021. The new rules (known as the .au Domain Administration Rules: Licensing) apply to all domain names created or renewed after 12 April 2021.

The new rules provide an "Australian presence" requirement for all domain name holders. To satisfy the Australian presence requirement, an individual must be an Australian permanent resident or citizen, while an organisation must either be incorporated in Australia or hold an Australian Business Number (ABN). Holders of an Australian trade mark also satisfy the Australian presence requirement, provided the domain name is an exact match of the trade mark.

For most domain types, the licensing rules also require that the domain name must be:

- a match, acronym or abbreviation of the name of the holder; or
- a match of the name of products, services, events, programs, premises or activities associated with the domain name holder; or
- a match of the holder's Australian trade mark.

Sublicensing of a domain name is prohibited, unless the domain name holder is a parent company of the licensee.

Domain name monetisation is prohibited in the .org.au, .asn.au, .id.au and .edu.au and State/Territory geographic namespaces. Domain Name Monetisation is defined in the Licensing Rules as the practice of "application for a licence by a Person with the sole purpose of selling, leasing or holding the applied for Domain Name to generate revenue." and includes warehousing or acquiring domain name licenses for the sole purpose of transfer to another purpose.

=== .au Dispute Resolution Policy (auDRP) ===
Domain name disputes between parties are handled under the .au Dispute Resolution Policy (auDRP), which was adapted from the UDRP by Philip Argy for auDA.

The auDRP was adopted in 2016, and applies to all domain names in the Australian open 2LD's registered after 2002. All domain registrants and registrars are contractually required to agree to the auDRP under the terms of registration or accreditation, and are bound by decisions issued by auDRP Dispute Resolution Providers.

auDRP complaints are determined by an external accredited dispute resolution provider. The resolution provider is chosen by the complainant. As of 2022, there are two auDA-approved dispute resolution providers:

- the World Intellectual Property Organization; and
- the Resolution Institute (formerly LEADR & IAMA).

A single domain name dispute may concern one or more Australian domain names.

The decision-making panel comprises either a single panelist or three panelists, at the complainant's election. If the complainant elects a single panelist, the respondent (domain holder) may elect to have the proceeding determined by three panelists instead. The decision is made "on the papers" (that is, on the basis of written submissions by the complainant and the respondent) and no hearings are required.

Upon lodgement of an auDRP complaint, the domain name's registrar of record is required to impose a registry lock on the domain name until the completion of the proceeding. This is to prevent the respondent from altering or transferring the domain name during the dispute.

Panelists must follow the auDRP. In addition to the formal auDRP Rules, each Resolution Provider may prescribe Supplemental Rules, relating to their requirements for format of submissions, timing and processes. Panellists are not bound to follow formal rules of evidence, or precedent. However, there are published practice guidelines for auDRP panelists.

To succeed in a domain name complaint under the auDRP, the complainant must establish all three of the following grounds:

1. the complainant has rights in a trademark and the disputed domain name is identical or confusingly similar to that trademark;
2. the respondent (domain holder) has no legitimate rights or interests in respect of the domain name; and
3. the respondent has registered or used the domain name in bad faith. (This criterion is a key difference from the UDRP, which requires registration and use in bad faith.)

There are two remedies available to a successful complainant:

- cancellation of the domain name (the domain name is dropped and returned to the pool of available domain names); or
- transfer of the domain name to the complainant, provided the complainant satisfies the eligibility requirements to hold the domain name.

If a successful decision is issued, then unless Court proceedings are commenced within 10 business days, the remedy is implemented automatically by the domain name's registrar of record without input from the respondent.

Decisions issued under the auDRP are published in an archive database.

== Domain statistics ==
auDA issues an Annual Report as at the end of each financial year (30 June). Since 2019, auDA has also issued quarterly statistical reports. These reports contain statistical information about the performance of the .au domain and other information about auDA's operations during the reporting period.

According to auDA's Annual Reports, the total domains under management (being the total number of active domain names) and average new domains created per month are as follows:

Financial year	Total domains under management	Average new domains created per month	Reference
2021–22	3,603,924	61,000	
2020–21	3,339,032	51,300	
2019–20	3,180,395	44,700	
2018–19	3,193,421	Not stated	
2017–18	3,153.979	Not stated	
2016–17	3,111,507	Not stated	

The .com.au second-level domain namespace accounts for the vast majority of domain name registrations. In 2020–21, the number of .com.au domains registered exceeded 3 million for the first time.

== Other Australian domain names ==
.au is not the only top-level domain name assigned to Australia. Some Australian territories have their own ISO 3166-1 alpha-2 code, and therefore have their own ccTLD as well:

Domain	Territory
.cx	Christmas Island
.cc	Cocos (Keeling) Islands
.nf	Norfolk Island
.hm	Heard Island and McDonald Islands

As the appropriate authorities were late in recognising the need to manage these, most were registered by entrepreneurs for use as vanity domains unrelated to the locale they serve. .cc, for example, is now operated by VeriSign. .hm represents a nature preserve with no human inhabitants.

Some Australian local government authorities have adopted *.cc domains as a convenient abbreviation for "City Council". For example, the Brisbane City Council uses the domain name "bne.cc" as a URL shortener.

There are also two geographic top-level domain names assigned to Australia in which are used by individuals and businesses within a particular region, they are:

Domain	Usage
.melbourne	For Victorian registered businesses, entities associated with the state of Victoria or Australian citizens and residents with a Victorian address
.sydney	For New South Wales registered businesses, entities associated with the state of New South Wales or Australian citizens and residents with a New South Wales address
