= SABRENet =

The South Australian Broadband Research & Education Network (SABRENet) is a fibre-optic broadband network linking the major research and education sites in metropolitan Adelaide, South Australia.

At over 110 km, SABRENet is the second largest underground network in Adelaide after Telstra's.

Sites connected to SABRENet include

- All of Adelaide's university campuses
- Most teaching hospitals
- TAFE colleges
- Some public high schools
- Research precincts and science parks
- The Techport Australia maritime precinct
- Two AARNet POPs

SABRENet has been supported by the Australian Government under the Systemic Infrastructure Initiative, and forms part of the Australian Research and Education Network.

SABRENet Ltd is a non-profit public company formed by the SABRENet Members to build, own and operate SABRENet. The SABRENet Ltd members are Flinders University, the South Australian Government, the University of Adelaide and the University of South Australia.

== See also ==
- Systemic Infrastructure Initiative
- AARNet
