= Nextgen Networks =

Australian communications company

Nextgen Group Pty Ltd
- Type: Subsidiary
- Industry: Telecommunications
- Founded: 2001; 25 years ago
- Products: Wholesale network, fibre network
- Services: Wholesale network
- Parent: Vocus Group
- Website: www.nextgengroup.com.au

Nextgen Networks is a wholly owned subsidiary of Vocus Group. Nextgen's Network is based on a geographically protected national network, with the Brisbane to Melbourne link utilising self-healing SDH two-fibre ring architecture. The Ring System covers Brisbane, Sydney, Canberra and Melbourne and a Flat Ring Link through to Adelaide and Perth as well as covering 70 major and regional population centres along the route. The network covers a total of 17,000 km.

== History ==
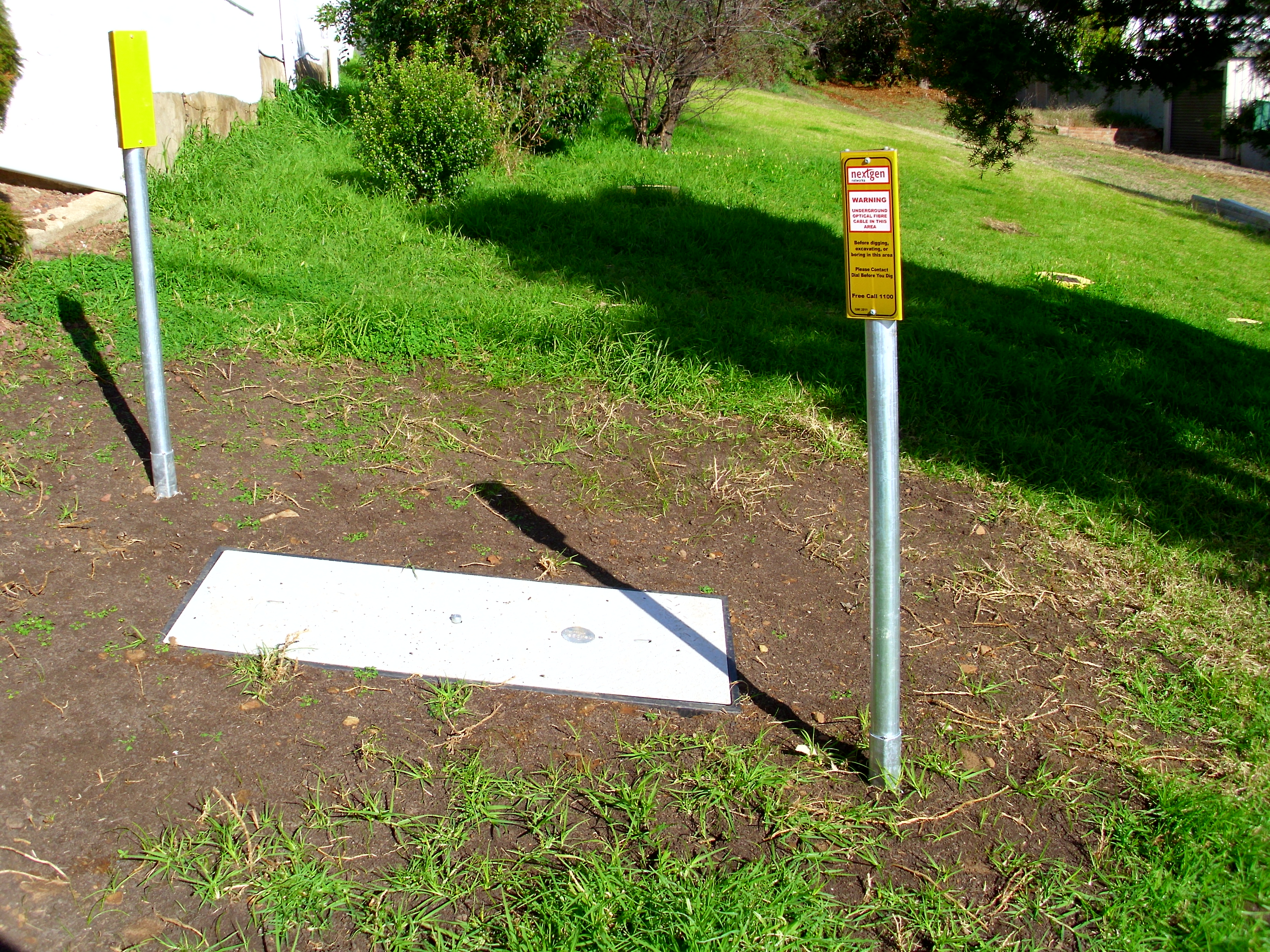
NextGen Networks pit

The network was constructed in 2002 and cost around $850 million to construct as a joint venture of Leighton Contractors ($140 million) and Macquarie Bank using state of the art equipment from suppliers such as Lucent and financed by a consortium including Leighton Holdings, Macquarie Bank, National Australia Bank, Deutsche Bank, UBS and WestLB.

Visionstream, a subsidiary of Leighton Contractors, constructed the network consisting of four network loops each with 12 fibre pairs, with each fibre pair capable of 800 Gbit/s. The network owners intention was to provide the highest network quality, which led to the use of using many state of the art technologies (at the time).

Lucent supplied the TrueWave RS G655 Fibre developed by Bell Labs to provide high bandwidth capacity and specially designed for long distance DWDM optical cables. Being a Non-zero dispersion shifted fibre it has minimum light dispersion, allowing signals to travel long distances with enough dispersion to prevent crosstalk from adjacent signals. It was built to Australian conditions to prevent against not only rodents but wombats, Christmas tree roots and erosion from black soil.

Lucent also supplied newest technology WaveStar OLS 400G DWDM systems and WaveStar Bandwidth Manager.

Nettest's QUESTfiber technology supplied the remote fibre test system (the largest network of its type in the Australia Pacific region) within the Nextgen Networks DWDM network. This gives the benefit of a fully managed network backbone with minimal downtime, when a fault is detected the location is known to within a few metres, as well as showing the health of the cables and its segments, allowing for preemptive maintenance where cable is showing signs of distress.

== The building of the network ==
Visionstream commenced building of the Network on 15 June 2001 with the first soil being turned and commencement of laying the fibre 40 km west of Young, New South Wales at Milvale, after many months of project management planning which included sourcing of materials, negotiating access along the route that the cable and equipment will travel, environmental management and working with indigenous leaders to fully gps map sensitive areas to avoid damage.

The project was brought in ahead of schedule in May 2003, construction was handed over from Visionstream to Nextgen Networks in four main Stages occurring at the following dates.

Stage	Location	Handover Date
Stage 1	Melbourne - Sydney Loop	30 September 2002
Stage 2	Sydney - Brisbane Loop	20 January 2003
Stage 3	Melbourne - Adelaide	7 December 2002
Stage 4	Adelaide - Perth	15 May 2003

Activities included route construction, urban works, cultural heritage walkouts and the construction of Primary Nodes in each capital city on the route (the Primary Nodes serve as the prime point of interconnection in the network by which customers will access their services).

During 2002 trouble hit the consortium of Nextgen Networks, and although the network was solid the traffic and sales needed to support the financing unfortunately did not eventuate, During the twelve month price war competition bit hard on Nextgen and the other intercity cable providers with the price of backhaul between Australian cities dropping by 70% leaving Nextgen without the funds it needed to repay the debt. This situation was repeated right around the world with many similar owners of fibre optic cables also in financial difficulty and here in Australia with another major Fibre Optic Cable player Amcom backed IP1 Australia who built cable networks from Melbourne through to Perth going into receivership and bought at a fire sale price of $45m (about a quarter of its construction cost of $160m) by Telstra. Also during this period, a multi terabit international cable Nava-1 was shelved.

On 23 June 2003 administrators were called in by the National Australia Bank.

Assured of significant financial commitment by AARNet to utilize the network, on 24 December 2003 Leighton Holdings acquired Nextgen Networks for a total between $20 million and $30 million with the banking syndicate having a share in the company's growth for the next 10 years. Nextgen became a full subsidiary of Leighton Holdings and therefore became debt free.

== Timeline ==
- 15 June 2001 Nextgen's network construction begins from Brisbane to Perth
- 2002 Metronode's first Data Centre becomes operational in West Melbourne
- 15 May 2003 Nextgen completes construction from Brisbane to Perth
- 24 December 2003 Leighton Holdings acquires Nextgen Networks
- 2006 The Infoplex Cloud business is established
- 8 March 2006 Nextgen launched Australia's first Virtual Private LAN Service.
- 30 June 2006 Senetas and Nextgen launched Layer 2 Ethernet VPN, which features encrypted security
- 2 June 2008 Nextgen announced the acquisition of rival carrier Silk Telecom.
- 2009 Peter McGrath becomes Managing Director
- 2 July 2009 Premier Media Group awards Nextgen Networks as provider for high capacity links to major sporting venues
- December 2009 Nextgen Networks wins NBN 0m Regional Backbone Blackspot Program (RBBP)
- October 2010 Nextgen delivers Australian first 100 Gb fibre-optic network
- November 2010 Nextgen wins high-capacity transmission contract for Vodafone
- 10 May 2011 ASC Announces Australia to Singapore cable project to build, own and operate 4,800 km multi-terabit submarine cable system.
- October 2011 Nextgen delivers RBBP project for NBN
- 2012 Australia to Singapore cable system project build begins
- August 2012 Metronode completes industry-leading PUE data centre facility
- June 2013 Leighton Holdings sold Nextgen to a joint venture owned by Ontario Teachers' Pension Plan (70%) and Leighton Holdings (30%) for $885 million.
- July 2013 Nextgen Group Holdings Pty Ltd formed, Legacy Nextgen Networks, Metronode and Infoplex business go to market under single brand Nextgen Group
- 9 August 2013 Metronode launches NSW Government next generation data centre
- November 2014 Long term Managing Director Peter McGrath departs Nextgen Networks
- April 2015 David Yuile takes over as CEO of Netxgen Networks
- 29 June 2016 Vocus Group announces $861 million acquisition of assets from Nextgen Group including Nextgen Networks, North West Cable System (NWCS) and the future Australia Singapore Cable project
- 26 October 2016 Vocus completes acquisition
