= Geoff Huston (scientist) =

Australian computer scientist

- Born: 1956 or 1957 (age 68–69)
- Citizenship: Australia
- Known for: AARNet
- Awards: Internet Hall of Fame, Member of the Order of Australia
- Scientific career
- Institutions: Australian Vice-Chancellors' Committee, APNIC, Telstra, ISOC
- Website: www.potaroo.net

Geoff Huston AM is a scientist who orchestrated the construction of the first internet network between Australian universities known as AARNet.

== Career ==
=== Studies ===
Geoff Huston studied at the Australian National University where he received his Bachelor of Science and then his Masters of Science which specialized in computer science. He then kept on working at ANU on computer networks.

=== Work on AARNet ===
Computer networks had become common within universities but there were no real networks connecting universities to each other except for small networks like CISRONET and SPEARNet. These single protocol networks were not compatible with every computer and therefore had not been widely adopted. The lack of a real network in between universities a decade after the creation of ARPANet pushed academics to organize in an attempt to create a network similar to it. The Australian Vice-Chancellors' Committee was approached to build the network and following a review of the initiative they recruited Huston to design and implement the network. He was chosen for the job because he had already worked on a plan to build the network previously.

After his plan was approved, Huston bought the necessary routers and set off with his colleague Peter Elford to set up these routers on each campus effectively bringing in 1990 the long awaited Australian Academic and Research Network online. The network was extremely popular from the get go and required constant upgrades to keep up with demand. The pressure to upgrade the network was so strong that the Australian Vice-Chancellors' Committee sold AARNet to Telstra in 1995. This acquisition also included Huston as his expertise on the network was key for its development.

=== Work post AARNet ===
While Telstra's 1996 proposal for AARNet2 was not accepted, Huston stayed at the company and developed its internet offerings as the Chief Internet Scientist until 2005. During that period he also was a member and then the executive director of the Internet Architecture Board, a member of the board trustees and then the chair of the Internet Society, a member of the board of the Public Internet Registry and the chair of the Internet Engineering and Planning Group among others.

=== Current activities ===
He is currently working for the Asia Pacific Network Information Centre as Chief Scientist. He is also an active member of the Internet Engineering Task Force.

== Opinions ==
While looking back at his role in the spread of the internet, Geoff has expressed frustration at how the internet has been developed and how it has impacted society. He referred to it as a "gigantic vanity-reinforcing distorted TikTok selfie". He believes that the fundamental protocols that underpin the Web have been badly programmed and that they do not guarantee a safe internet. Likewise he thinks that the internet has been perverted into a space in which misinformation is rampant and where a new predatory marketplace has been established. He also supports and advocates for net neutrality.

== Awards and honours ==
- 2012 - inducted into the Internet Hall of Fame by the Internet Society.
- 2015 - inducted into the Pearcey Hall of Fame.
- 2020 - made Member of the Order of Australia.

== Bibliography ==
- ISP Survival Guide: Strategies for Running a Competitive ISP (ISBN 978-0471314998)
- Internet Performance Survival Guide: QoS Strategies for Multiservice Networks (ISBN 978-0471378082)
- Quality of Service: Delivering QoS on the Internet and in Corporate Networks (ISBN 978-0471243588)
