= Cotton Australia =

Australian industry trade group

Cotton Australia (formerly the Australian Cotton Foundation) is an Australian industry trade group representing cotton farmers and corporations in New South Wales and Queensland, Australia.

It is a non-profit organisation funded via a voluntary levy of $2.25 per bale of cotton produced by its members.

Cotton Australia lobbies state and national governments regarding cotton industry regulation, pricing and environmental management and maintains an advice and support network for cotton growers on the Australian east coast.

== See also ==
- Agriculture in Australia
- International Year of Natural Fibres 2009
- Australian Textile Mills
