= Wildlife Victoria =

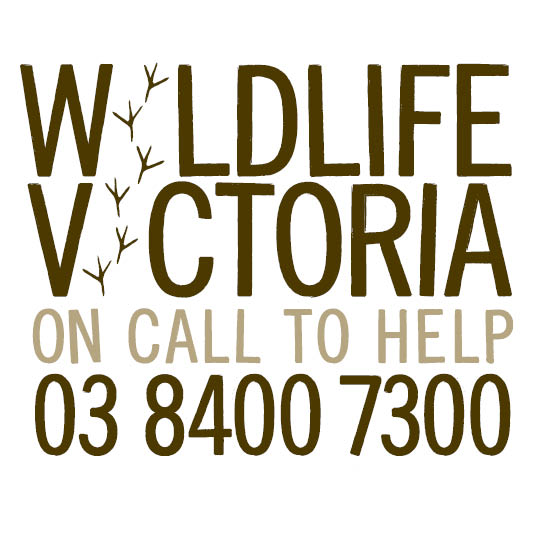
- Wildlife Victoria logo emergency number
- Website: www.wildlifevictoria.org.au

Wildlife Victoria is a not for profit organisation that provides a wildlife emergency response service to the state of Victoria, Australia. Founded in 1989 by Clare Davis, Denice Garrett, Sari Cuce, Marilyn Bradley, Anita Burch and a group of their colleagues who worked out of the RSPCA wildlife Branch. They recognised there was a need for a 24/7 wildlife rescue service so created the Wildlife Care Network, now known as Wildlife Victoria.

What started off as a small team of volunteers has now grown into an organisation of over 1,400 volunteers. This service provides essential emergency wildlife support to the community by responding to enquiries from the public regarding sick, injured and orphaned wildlife.

The organisation maintains a wildlife care and communications network of wildlife volunteers spanning the state of Victoria. This includes volunteer wildlife shelters, rescuer, carers and transporters, emergency services, government agencies and commercial operators.

Wildlife emergencies can be logged with the organisation via a dedicated telephone service that operates 24 hours, 7 days per week, or via the organisation's website. The emergency response service uses a comprehensive database to locate the closest available and suitable experienced volunteer, who then locates the animal and determines the appropriate course of action.

In FY2024, Wildlife Victoria handled more than 130,000 enquiries from the public and assisted almost 90,000 native animals during their time of need.

Wildlife Victoria also provides wildlife information and education to the public on matters including wildlife related road trauma, wildlife safe fruit tree netting, how to check a marsupial's pouch for a joey and assisting native animals during heat stress.

A diverse range of animals is provided with emergency assistance, including kangaroos, possums, cockatoos, koalas, bats, blue tongued lizards, ducks and fur seals.

The organisation relies on donations from the public to fund its work. Under legal obligations in the state of Victoria, native animals must be returned to the wild after they have been successfully rehabilitated.

Wildlife Victoria responds to a displaced wallaby in Doncaster

Wildlife Victoria’s Chair is Adrienne Duarte and Lisa Palma is the CEO.

== See also ==
- Animal welfare and rights in Australia
