= MHSnet =

Message Handling System for wide area networks

MHSnet is a store-and-forward Message Handling System for wide area networks. MHSnet and its precursor, SUNIII, were used to implement the Australian Computer Science network, commonly known as ACSnet, which connected Australia's Universities to each other and to ARPANET.

MHSnet was originally developed at the University of Sydney by Piers Lauder and Bob Kummerfeld and was originally known as SUNIII (Sydney University Network version 3). Technically, it is similar in concept to UUCP in that it enabled the transfer of email, Usenet, and files in an efficient manner over non-dedicated links. In addition, it supported dynamic routing and a hierarchical name space avoiding the limitations of hardwired network addresses.

MHSnet was a key technology in the introduction of Internet access in Australia. Due to the prohibitive costs of telecommunications structure, and the small amount of bandwidth available both internally and to other countries, MHSnet provided a system that could more efficiently use network resources. Gateways between ACSnet and the Internet were provided by many universities, and access to non-academic users was granted in the early 1990s.

In 1989, with the introduction of AARNet which directly connected Australia's Universities to the Internet, the ACSnet and MHSnet became obsolete.

ACSnet connected hosts in Australia resided in a .oz domain, which was moved into the Internet's .au namespace as .oz.au.
