= Chris Disspain =

Australian lawyer

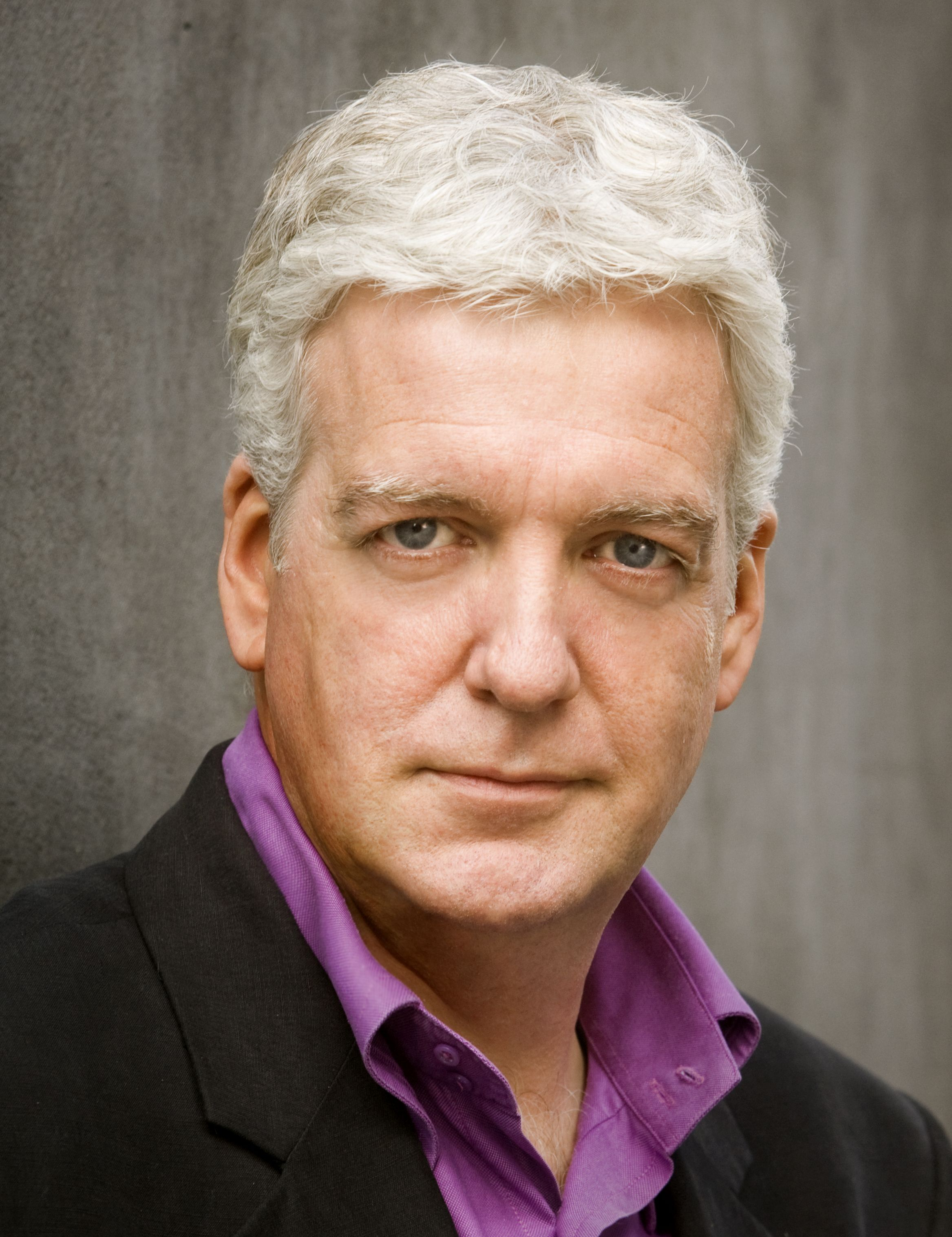
Chris Disspain

Interview with Disspain on his time at ICANN

Chris Disspain is an Australian corporate lawyer and executive who primarily works in the technology sector.

In 1995 he co-authored the self help book Create Your Fuller Life Map, which focused proposed ways to create and execute more effective goals.

He was the first Chair of ICANN's country-code top-level domain organization (ccNSO) in 2004 and worked in that role until 2011. He also worked on developing the policies enabling the first use of non-Latin scripts in top-level domains. he was later a Director of ICANN (Internet Corporation for Assigned Names and Numbers) for 9 years (2011–2020), working for a time as its vice-chair.

In 2005, he created The auDA Foundation, a charity to increase internet use and literacy in the Australian community. He was the Foundation chair from 2005 to 2016.

From 2006 to 2013, Disspain was a member of the United Nations Secretary-General's Internet Governance Multi-Stakeholder Advisory Group.

From 2013 to 2016 he was a director of the Internet Society of Australia.
