= Universities Australia =

Peak body for Australian University sector

- Predecessor: Australian Vice-Chancellors' Committee
- Formation: Sydney in May 1920
- Founded at: Sydney
- Type: tertiary education peak body
- Legal status: non-profit organisation
- Purpose: Peak body for universities
- Headquarters: Canberra, ACT
- Location: Canberra, ACT
- Chief Executive Officer: Mr Luke Sheehy
- Chairperson: Professor David Lloyd
- Website: www.universitiesaustralia.edu.au

Universities Australia (formerly the Australian Vice-Chancellors' Committee) is an organisation founded in Sydney in May 1920, which attempts to advance higher education through voluntary, cooperative and coordinated action. After being based for a time in both Sydney and Melbourne, its offices relocated to Canberra in 1966. It is a private company whose members are Australia's 39 universities. The universities are represented by their vice-chancellors.

The current chair of Universities Australia is University of South Australia Vice-Chancellor and President, Professor David Lloyd. Its CEO is Mr Luke Sheehy.

== Transition from the AVCC ==
In September 2006, the AVCC announced an overhaul of the organization following a review by consultant David Phillips, Director of PhillipsKPA. The AVCC was to change its name to Universities Australia and restructure to become a peak industry body. All universities were to be eligible for membership of Universities Australia, and would be represented by the CEOs. In October, the committee decided the current President, Deputy President and Board of Directors would leave their current positions by June 2007, and the CEO would leave the position on 31 December 2006.

== Objectives ==
Universities Australia is non-partisan and exists exclusively for educational purposes. Its continuing aim is to serve the best interests of the universities, and through them, the nation. According to its website, its aims are to

- advance and promote the benefits of Australian Universities to the nation;
- support Australian Universities in the performance of their roles;
- develop policy positions on higher education matters through discussing higher education issues including teaching, research and research training;
- advance internationalisation of Australian Universities;
- provide information for and about Australian Universities;
- provide services and programs to Australian Universities including the negotiation of common purchasing arrangements;
- promote the welfare of students, staff and graduates of Australian Universities;
- facilitate opportunities for Australian Universities (in particular, their students, staff and graduates) to develop their knowledge and skills;
- study the problems and needs of Australian Universities and their relations with other education institutions, organisations and the community and to encourage and sponsor their study; and
- assist in the further development of Australian Universities.

Universities Australia has representatives, or nominated people, on some 67 external national and international bodies of importance to higher education. These include the Prime Minister’s Science, Engineering and Innovation Council, the Association of Commonwealth Universities Council, the Australian Qualifications Framework Advisory Board, the Research Quality Framework Development Advisory Group, the Australian Medical Council, and the National Cultural Heritage Advisory Committee.

Universities Australia represents (and is funded by contributions from) 38 of Australia's 39 universities.

== Higher Ed Services ==
Higher Ed Services (HES) is a not-for-profit, professional services company owned by Universities Australia. It specialises in the provision of management services for collaborative development projects for the universities in Australia.

The business consultants of HES collaborate with collaborative groups in developing common strategies to address the business challenges facing the sector. It designs innovative business and contractual models to realise the outcomes required, capitalising on the opportunities initiated by collaborating universities.

== AARNet ==
While an activity of the AVCC, AARNet built the Internet in Australia. AARNet was established under the AVCC in 1989. The AVCC sold AARNet1 as a going concern to Telstra, then Telecom Australia, in 1995. AARNet Pty Ltd was established as a separate company from AVCC in 1998.

== See also ==
- List of Australian university leaders
