= InternetNZ =

Internet governance organization for the New Zealand internet domain (.nz)

- Founded: 1995
- Type: Non-profit
- Registration no.: CC30982
- Location: Level 13, 18 Willis Street, Wellington, New Zealand
- Coordinates: 41.2866432°S 174.772587°E
- Region served: New Zealand
- Key people: Chief Executive: Vivien Maidaborn; Council President: Joy Liddicoat
- Subsidiaries: New Zealand Domain Name Registry Limited, Domain Name Commission Limited
- Website: internetnz.nz
- Formerly called: Internet Society of New Zealand

InternetNZ (officially Internet New Zealand Inc., formerly the Internet Society of New Zealand) is a not-for-profit open membership organisation and the designated manager for the .nz country code top-level internet domain. It also supports the development of New Zealand's internet through policy, community grants, research, and events.

== About ==
As the designated manager for the .nz top level internet domain, InternetNZ represents New Zealand at a global level. It supports the development of New Zealand's internet through policy and grants to individuals and organisations, research, and events. Part of the work of InternetNZ is advocacy and commentary. It makes submissions to New Zealand Select Committees, and in 2020 commented on the legislative process of the Films, Videos, and Publications Classification (Urgent Interim Classification of Publications and Prevention of Online Harm) Amendment Bill, which is an update to a 1993 Act.

== Organisational structure ==
The full name of InternetNZ is Internet New Zealand Incorporated and it is a registered incorporated society in New Zealand. It is a non-profit society with charitable status and is overseen by a council. It has a subsidiary organisation, the Domain Name Commission Ltd (DNCL). The Domain Name Commission supports the work of InternetNZ including administering an independent dispute resolution service.

=== Council ===
The InternetNZ Council is the governing body for InternetNZ. It is made of nine members elected by the membership and two appointed members.

==== Council members ====
The elected InternetNZ council as at 27 July 2023 are Joy Liddicoat (President), Brenda Wallace (Vice President), Kate Pearce, Richard Hulse, Anthony Bow, Jeff Montgomery, Potaua Biasiny-Tule, Alpana Roy, Whetu Fala, Anjum Rahman, and Stephen Judd.

==== Chief Executive ====
- Viven Maidaborn (2022–)
- Andrew Cushen, interim Chief Executive (2022)
- Jordan Carter (2013–2022)
- Vikram Kumar (2010–2013)

== History ==
The Internet Society of New Zealand was originally formed in 1995 to take responsibility for the .nz country code top-level domain. In 2006 the Internet Society of New Zealand joined the Internet Society as an organisational member. Despite sharing many aims with the Internet Society, InternetNZ is not a chapter of the Internet Society. On the 31 October 2007 InternetNZ formalised its relationship with the Internet Corporation for Assigned Names and Numbers (ICANN). In doing so ICANN recognised InternetNZ as the country code top level domain manager for .nz. In April 2008, The Internet Society of New Zealand formally changed its official name to Internet New Zealand Inc.

In late September 2023, InternetNZ started work on a new constitution. In October 2024, the organisation released drafting guidelines that were shared with members. Proposed changes included provisions that would respect the Treaty of Waitangi and include a Māori co-chair. In addition, it was proposed that the organisation's governing body be reduced from 11 members to 7–9 members, and that four members would be appointed for specific skills. In late February 2025, the Free Speech Union (FSU) objected to InternetNZ's proposed constitution, claiming that it would make the organisation "less democratic, more ideological, and primed for censorship." The FSU also objected to the proposal on the grounds that a third of the InternetNZ board would consist of Māori. In response, InternetNZ president Stephen Judd accused the FSU of misrepresenting the proposal changes and "creating confusion about the purpose of the constitutional review." By 27 February 2025, The Post reported that InternetNZ's membership had swelled from 280 to 1,200 over the past week after the Free Speech Union and another advocacy group called Hobson's Pledge encouraged their members to join in order to vote against the proposed constitution. Judd speculated that the increase in membership was a response by others joining to counteract the influence of the FSU.

== InternetNZ Fellows ==
InternetNZ periodically confers the InternetNZ Fellowship award on people who make ‘an outstanding contribution to the development of the internet in New Zealand’.

- Di Daniels, 2018
- Keitha Booth, 2018
- James Watts, 2018
- Nat Torkington, 2018
- Rick Shera, 2017
- Richard Orzecki, 2015
- Don Stokes, 2013
- Dean Pemberton, 2012
- Donna Hiser, 2012
- Keith Davidson, 2011
- David Farrar, 2011
- Simon Riley, 2011
- Colin Jackson, 2010
- Laurence Zwimpfer, 2010
- Peter Dengate Thrush, 2008
- Liz Butterfield, 2006
- Joe Abley, 2005
- Mark Davies, 2004
- Roger Hicks, 2004
- Jim Higgins, 2004
- Andy Linton, 2004
- Nevil Brownlee, 2003
- John Vorstermans, 2003
- Rex Croft, 2001
- Frank March, 2001
- Donald Neal, 2001
- Neil James, 2001
- John Houlker, 1998
- Richard Naylor, 1998
- John H Hine, 1998

== Events ==
=== NetHui conference ===
From 2011–2020 InternetNZ organised NetHui conferences around New Zealand encouraging New Zealanders to meet and discuss the benefits and issues of the internet.

== See also ==
- Domainz
