= AARNet =

Research and education network in Australia

- Australia's Academic and Research Network
- Founded: 1989
- Founder: Australian Vice-Chancellors' Committee (AVCC)
- Region served: Australia
- Services: Internet service provider (ISP)
- Owner: 38 Australian universities and CSIRO
- Employees: 237
- Website: aarnet.edu.au
- ASN: 7575

AARNet (Australian Academic and Research Network) provides Internet services to the Australian education and research communities and their research partners.

AARNet built the Internet in Australia. In 1995, the Australian Vice-Chancellors' Committee (AVCC) transferred AARNet1 as a going concern to Telstra who then operated it as the initial Telstra Internet. Today, AARNet is Australia's National research and education network (NREN). It forms the Australian component of the global advanced research and education Internet network.

AARNet Pty Ltd, which owns and operates the AARNet, is a not-for-profit company limited by shares. The shareholders are 38 Australian universities and the Australian CSIRO. AARNet's services in addition to Internet connectivity include Eduroam, voice, video and data storage services and a content mirror.

== History ==
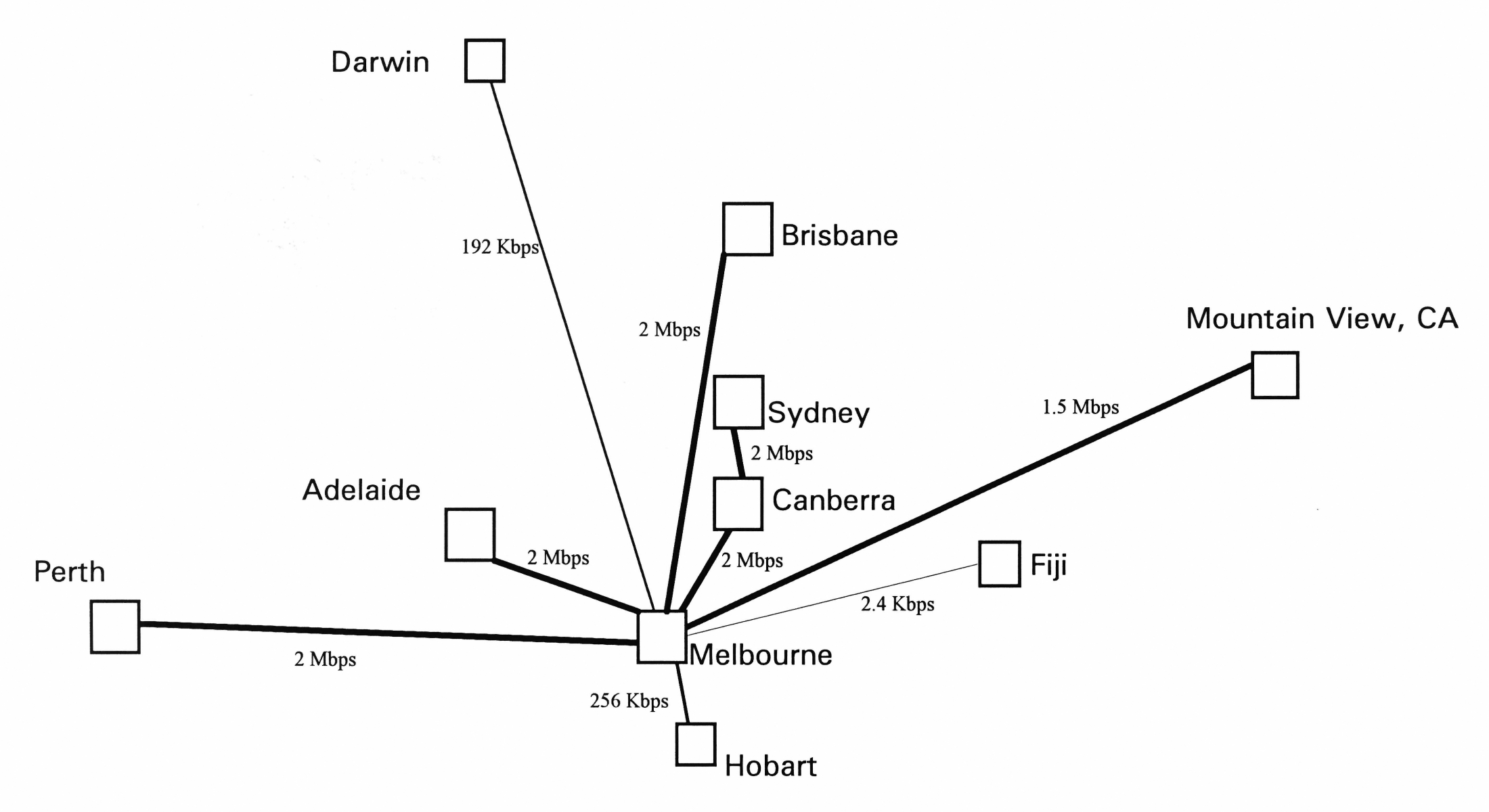
The AARNet network as at October 1993

AARNet was initially built between the University of Melbourne in Melbourne, where the international Internet feed initially landed, and university and CSIRO facilities in all Australian state capital cities and the Australian National University in Canberra. AARNet was formed in 1989 by the Australian Vice-Chancellors' Committee (AVCC).

In 1989, Kevin Robert Elz established the first permanent Internet feed to Australia, at the University of Melbourne. Until this time, researchers within Australia had limited access to the ARPANET, due to the high expense of providing communications between Australia and the United States. The national network infrastructure generally consisted of groups of hosts connected throughout the country exchanging mail and files on a periodic schedule using the SUNIII software and protocols, with several international dial-up links around the country exchanging this information where required.

AARNet was initially built as a multi-protocol network, comprising Internet Protocol (IP) as well as DECnet and X.25 so as to accommodate pre-existing ACSnet and SPEARnet systems then in current use. With the rapid subsequent growth in popularity of the Internet, AARNet soon evolved into an IP-only network. In 1988, there were a number of popular network protocols, such as IBM's SNA and the CCITT's X.25, and the ARPANET's IP protocol was only beginning to become favoured. Australian National University staff members Geoff Huston and Peter Elford were seconded by the Australian Vice-Chancellors' Committee in 1989 and tasked with technical management and build of the new network.

AARNet introduced its 'value added reseller' program to allow Internet service providers (ISPs) to use its network, the first being Connect.com.au in May 1994. AARNet gradually became a wholesale backbone network ISP, serving over 300 smaller ISPs by June 1995. At that point, about 20% of total AARNet traffic was from these other users, and Australian Vice-Chancellors' Committee decided to sell the AARNet commercial assets to Telstra, who currently operates it under the name Telstra Internet.

In early 1997, AARNet2 went into service, a network that used Asynchronous Transfer Mode (ATM) links and Internet services under a contract with Cable & Wireless Optus (CWO), now Optus. AARNet became a separate company from the Australian Vice-Chancellors' Committee in 1999.

In 2001 AARNet deployed its own international capacity by acquiring 310 Mbit/s of capacity from Sydney via Hawaii to Seattle. As of 2006, the current network is known as AARNet3, and the backbone uses a dark fibre network provided by Nextgen Networks.

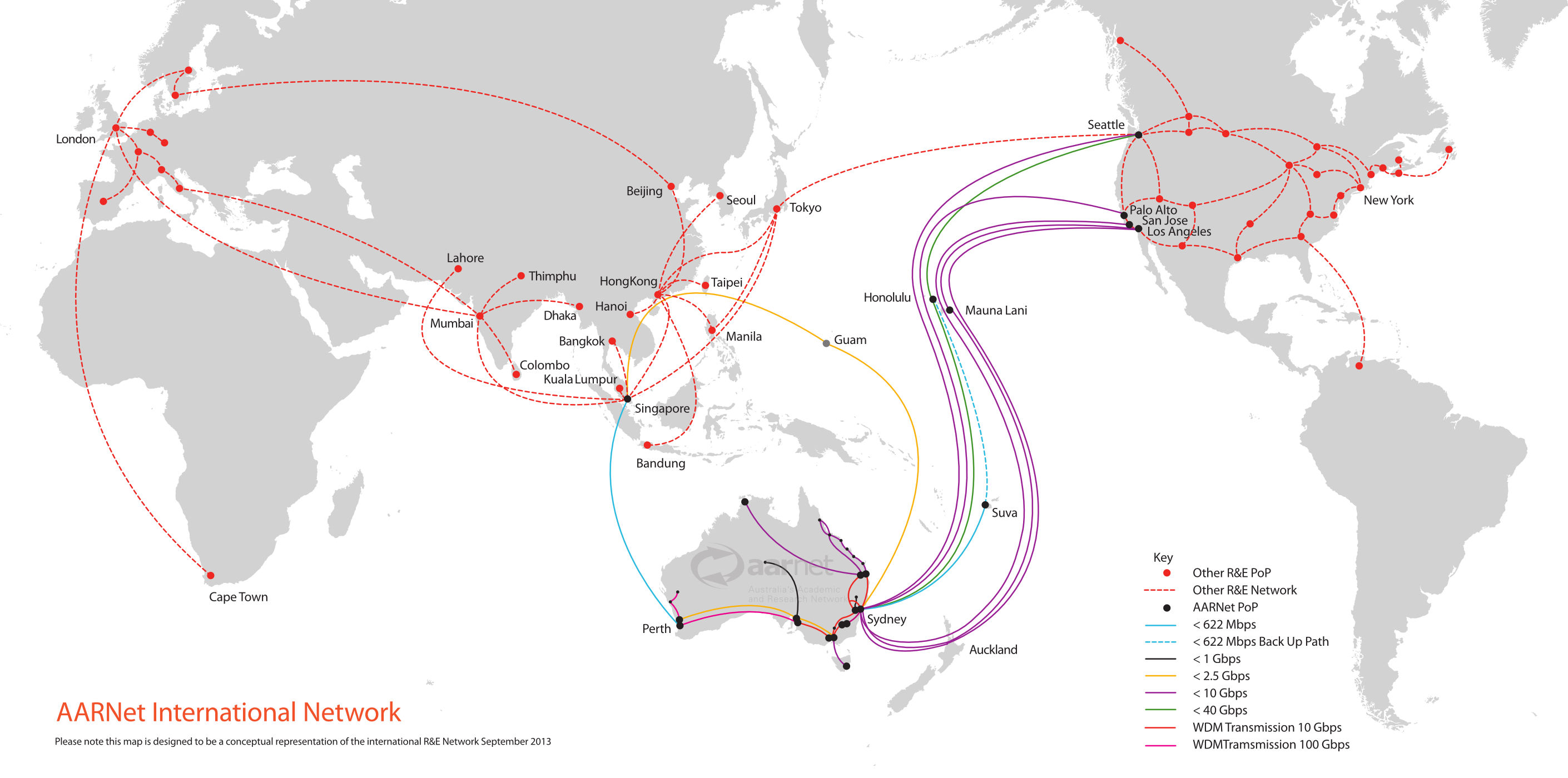
The AARNet international network as of September 2013, showing onward connections to peer networks of the national research and education network (NREN)

== Chronology ==
Major milestones in the development of AARNet include:

=== Pre-AARNet: Before the Internet ===
- 1963: CSIRONET established by the CSIRO's Division of Computing Research
- 1976: CSIRONET had grown to connect more than 50 computers spanning from Townsville to Hobart to Perth via a combination of dial-up and low speed leased line connections
- 1979: ACSnet formed – used MHSnet to transfer files, email and newsgroups between computers in Australian universities and to the United States via low speed dialup connections
- 1986: South Pacific Education and Research Network (SPEARnet) formed – used X.25-based Coloured Book protocols to interconnect 22 Australian and New Zealand universities
- 1989: Internet brought to Australia via a NASA-subsidized 56 kbit/s dedicated satellite circuit between the University of Melbourne and the University of Hawaiʻi

=== Early Years – Building the Internet in Australia ===
- 1989: AARNet established by the Australian Vice-Chancellors' Committee
- 1990: AARNet national backbone network built from Brisbane to Perth, each link initially at 48 kbit/s capacity, starring from a hub at the international Internet landing point at the University of Melbourne. AARNet national network was initially built as a multi-protocol layer 3 network, comprising Internet Protocol (IP) as well as DECnet and X.25 so as to accommodate the pre-existing ACSnet and SPEARnet networks. Connections to around 40 universities and CSIRO sites commissioned.
- 1990–92: International capacity increased in several rapid increments from 56 kbit/s to 1.5 Mbit/s, at an average 6 month doubling rate. In 1991, the national backbone links were upgraded to 2 Mbit/s. By 1992, AARNet connected 40,000 computers.
- 1991: 'Affiliate membership' programme and Acceptable use policy (AUP) established for government and research groups to join the network. By the end of 1993, AARNet provided services to over 300 government agencies and companies, including early Australian ISPs Connect.com.au, Pegasus Networks and Internode.
- 1993: Local links to major customer sites progressively upgraded from low capacity carrier leased lines to microwave links for more capacity, typically 10 Mbit/s, at lower costs
- 1994: 'Value-Added Reseller' programme established and AARNet's AUP broadened to accommodate growing demand for Internet access from a wider range of users, including ISPs OzEmail and iiNet
- 1995: The Australian Vice-Chancellors' Committee sold the then entire Australian Internet (AARNet1) as a going concern to Telstra, including staff, infrastructure (routers, etc.), intellectual property and the entire commercial customer base. Telstra then took over operating AARNet1 as its initial Telstra Internet.
- 1996: AARNet2 tender awarded to Optus, accelerating the build of Optus' Asynchronous Transfer Mode (ATM) and Internet infrastructure, capabilities and services
- 1997: AARNet2 ATM-based national network commissioned

=== Building the Foundations of AARNet ===
- 1998: AARNet Mirror site commissioned
- 1998: AARNet Pty Ltd established as a separate company
- 1999: Ownership of AARNet Pty Ltd transferred from the Australian Vice-Chancellors' Committee to Australia's universities and CSIRO
- 1999: AARNet's Voice over IP (VOIP) service commissioned
- 2000: AARNet telecommunications carrier license granted by Australian Communications Authority
- 2001: AARNet became the first research and education network to operate its own trans-oceanic optical-fibre capacity, initially comprising dual 155 Mbit/s links to Canada's CANARIE network
- 2002: GrangeNet built as a separate demonstration next generation network, through which various in the sector obtained their first exposure to then next generation gigabit Ethernet and long-haul optical fibre transmission systems. Later, when user institutions had operational need to interconnect their AARNet and GrangeNet services they also gained experience with the complexities of asymmetric routing.
- 2003: AARNet negotiated purchase from Southern Cross Cable of multi-gigabit 'SXTransPORT' trans-Pacific links via diverse paths
- 2003: AARNet buys into Nextgen Networks ensuring its survival as an independent long-haul optical-fibre infrastructure provider
- 2004: Dual 10 Gbit/s and dual 622 Mbit/s SXTransPORT trans-Pacific links commissioned
- 2006: AARNet3 national network commissioned

=== 2006 to Present Day ===
- 2007: Layer 1 point-to-point 1 Gbit/s transmission services ('EN4R') introduced for high-end research data transfer applications between points reached by the AARNet3 national network
- 2008: Direct link to Asia upgraded to 1 Gbit/s via diverse routes between Perth and Singapore, reducing latency (delay) to Asia, cf much commercial Internet traffic between Australia and Asia still traverses the Pacific Ocean twice via the USA.
- 2009: CloudStor cloud storage platform for researchers and academics goes live.
- 2011: High-capacity wavelength-division multiplexing (WDM) link built from Perth via Geraldton to the Australian site of the Square Kilometre Array (SKA) at the Murchison Radio-astronomy Observatory, and the various telescope facilities at the MRO in particular the initial Australian Square Kilometre Array Pathfinder (ASKAP) telescope array at the site.
- 2011: Second optical fibre path to Asia commissioned, from Sydney to Singapore via Guam, increasing AARNet's direct capacity to Asia to 1.2 Gbit/s
- 2012: International capacity increased to a total of 90 Gbit/s trans-Pacific plus a further 3.1 Gbit/s in two diverse routes to Asia
- 2013: AARNet4 announced, the AARNET optical network grows to 100G capacity which is upgrading the AARNet WDM national network capacity to multiple parallel 100 Gbit/s channels, ultimately 80 channels (total 8 Tbit/s).
- 2014: Partnership with Zoom is established to offer video communications services.
- 2019: Indigo subsea link connecting Sydney, Perth and Singapore goes live.
- 2020: Security Operations Centre goes live to offer cyber security services.
- 2021: JGA South subsea cable system connecting Sydney, Australia and Piti, Guam goes live.
- 2025: Chris Hancock retires as CEO and Ben White steps into the role to continue the ongoing exploration of new technologies, products and services for research and education.

== AARNet generations ==
Key milestones in the creation of the Internet in Australia

AARNet1 (1989–1997): Australia's first Internet:

- AARNet-operated layer 3 routers; one point of presence (PoP) per capital city
- national backbone: carrier-provided (Telstra) inter-PoP transmission capacity
- carrier-provided trans-Pacific transmission capacity
- AARNet1 sold to Telstra in 1995

AARNet2 (1997–2006): Fostered the building of Optus' Asynchronous Transfer Mode (ATM) and Optus' Internet networks:

- AARNet-operated layer 3 routers; one PoP per capital city
- national backbone: carrier-provided (Optus) inter-PoP ATM transmission capacity
- carrier-provided trans-Pacific transmission capacity

AARNet3 (2006–2013): The AARNet optical network:

- AARNet-operated layer 3 routers; two physically diverse PoPs in each capital city
- national backbone: AARNet-operated optical fibre transmission capacity
- AARNet-operated international fibre transmission capacity
- Also delivers enduser Layer 1 optical transmission and Layer 2 VLAN switching services

AARNet4 (2013–present): The AARNet optical network grows:

- entirely AARNet-operated
- national optical backbone: optical fibre transmission capacity ultimately 80 wavelengths each at 100 Gbit/s (total 8 Tbit/s)
- national IP network: 100 Gbit/s layer 3 routed network via diverse paths
- international connectivity: 240 Gbit/s of optical fibre transmission capacity, via six network interconnect points in the United States and one in Singapore
- enduser services: layer 1 point-to-point optical transmission; layer 2 metro-Ethernet VLAN; layer 2 and layer 3 Multiprotocol Label Switching MPLS-based virtual private network (VPN) services; high performance layer 3 routed access to global research and education (R&E) networks and the public Internet

== AARNet Pty Ltd ==
AARNet was established in 1989 originally as an activity under the auspices of the Australian Vice-Chancellors' Committee (AVCC).

AARNet was formed into a separate company on 22 December 1998. AARNet Pty Ltd, ACN 084540518, ABN 54 084 540 518, is a not-for-profit company limited by shares. The shareholders are 38 of Australia's universities and the Australian CSIRO.

AARNet Pty Ltd became a licensed telecommunications carrier (Telco) under the Australian Telecommunications Act on 27 November 2000, becoming Australian carrier number 61.

== National network ==
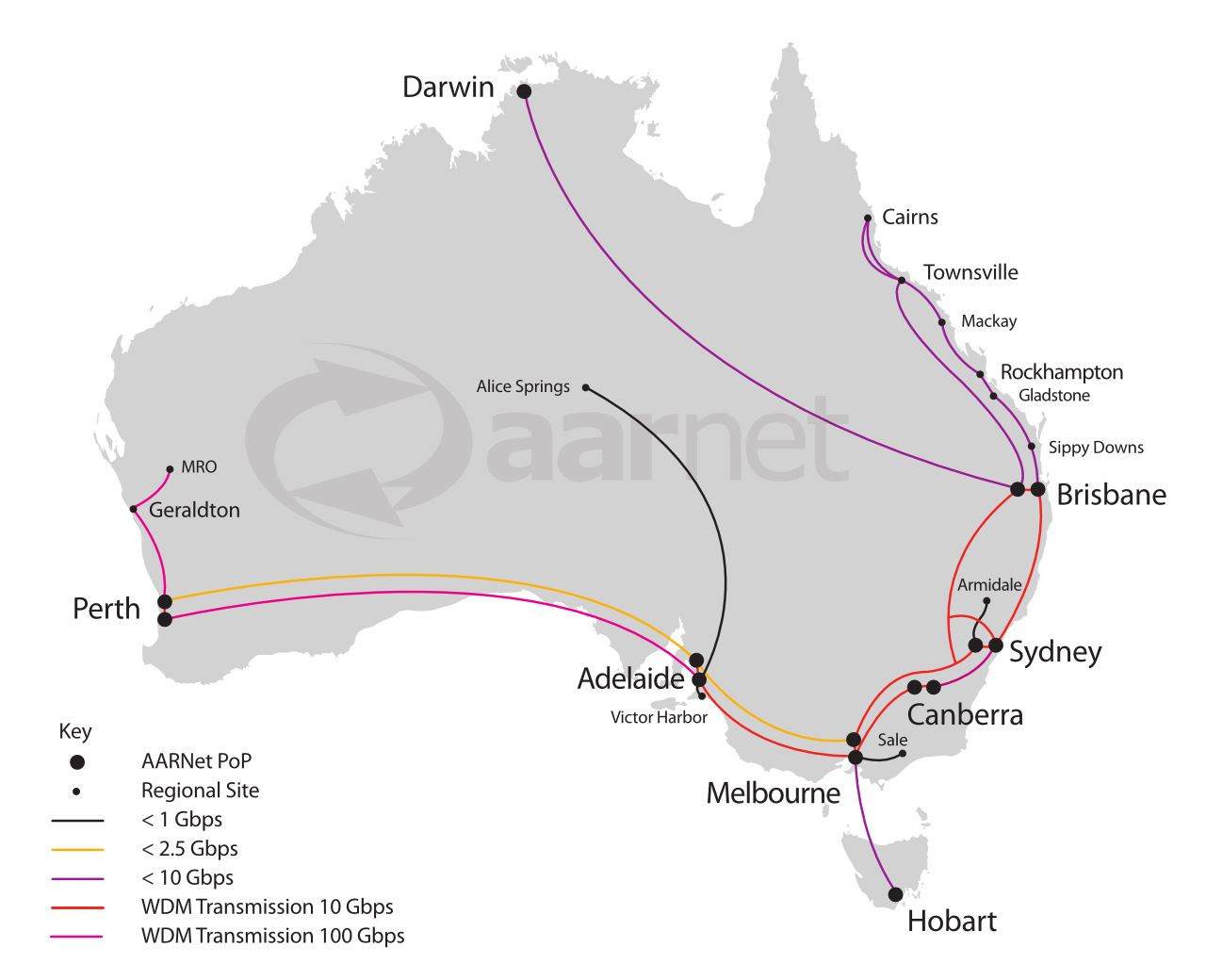
AARNet national network as at October 2013

The AARNet4 national network comprises high capacity optical fibre transmission paths between switching centres in major cities from Cairns to Perth as well as branch lines to Darwin, Hobart and several other locations. Because optical fibre repair times are long, the backbone network follows two physically diverse paths. As at late 2013, capacity on each leg of the routed network was between 10 and 100 gigabit per second (Gbit/s). Starting with only 48 kbit/s national backbone capacity in 1990, this reflects a similarly rapid exponential growth rate as for AARNet's international capacity.

The Network peers with external content providers and ISPs to increase performance and availability of the network. The organisation has a selective peering policy for peering with other providers. This policy applies to all requests for settlement-free interconnection with AARNet, either via dedicated connections or traffic via public internet exchanges.

AARNet provides the Internet to several million end-user devices at Australian universities, CSIRO, various other research and educational institutions, and some hospitals. Customer site connections are mostly at 1 to 10 Gbit/s rates, with most end-user Ethernet services at 1 Gbit/s, and Eduroam services at available Wi-Fi performance levels.

AARNet's layer 3 services are usually delivered at the AARNet PoP sites. With the introduction of the AARNet3 optical fibre network (i.e. from 2006 onwards) AARNet progressively developed capability to extend services to customer sites in some locations, as well as providing layer 1 and layer 2 inter-campus connections in those areas. Prior to that, and at other locations, it is end-customer institutions' responsibility to extend services to site and to provision their own inter-campus network links. These are either operated directly by AARNet such as in Queensland or provided by companion networks such as SABRENet in South Australia and VERNet in Victoria.

Summary of AARNet national IP network performance levels as at 2013:

- National backbone links: mostly 10 to 100 Gbit/s
- Customer site connections: mostly 1 to 10 Gbit/s
- End-user services: mostly 1 Gbit/s Ethernet and available Wi-Fi rates
- Continues to sustain traffic growth rates of 50% per annum year on year over the preceding decade

== International connectivity ==
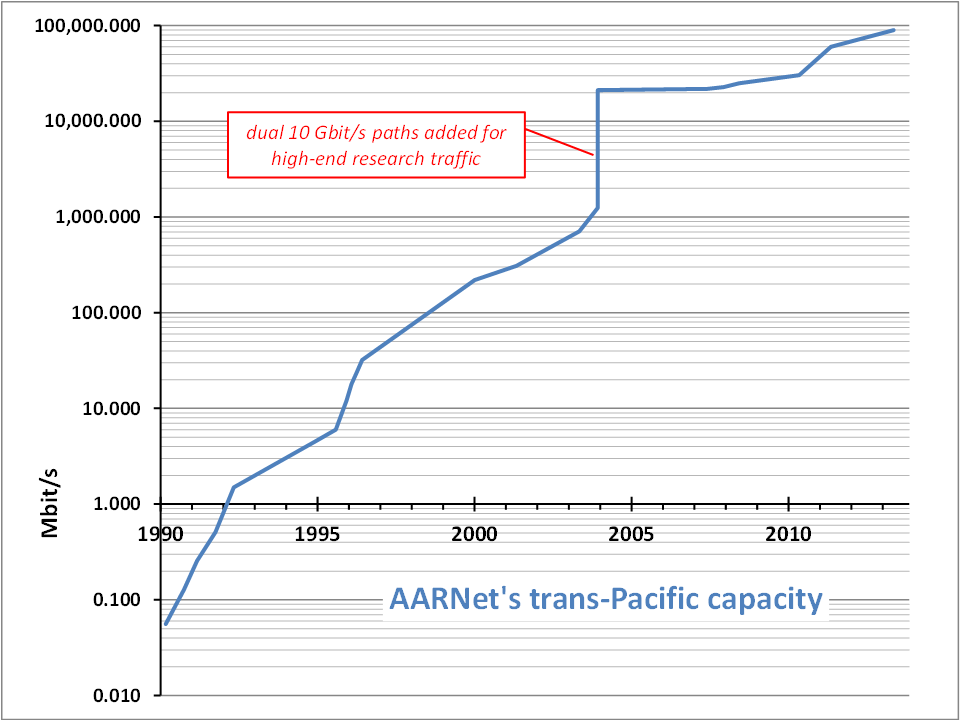
AARNet's trans-Pacific capacity growth from its inception to 2013

AARNet provides the Australian component of the global advanced Research and Education Internet network. AARNet has high capacity interconnections with North American (Internet2), European (GÉANT) and Asian (TEIN3) components of the global network.

As at late 2014, AARNet operated a total capacity of 120 Gbit/s to North America and a further 5 Gbit/s to Asia. This equates to a 2.2 million-fold increase over AARNet's initial trans-Pacific capacity of 56 kbit/s in 1990 and represents an average doubling time of aggregate international capacity of only 14 months over the entire history of AARNet (cf. Moore's Law).

== Application services ==
In addition to providing high capacity Internet transmission and routing services and a comprehensive range of core Internet services including Border Gateway Protocol (BGP), Domain Name System (DNS), Network Time Protocol (NTP) and IPv6, AARNet also provides a variety of higher-layer network services including:

- Eduroam global federated authentication service, most often appearing as Eduroam Wi-Fi services on-campus and at associated locations
- Voice over IP telephony services
- AUCX unified voice and video communications exchange
- Cloud services including CloudStor file storage service
- AARNet mirror site to reduce load on international links due to repeated downloads of the same material.

To further optimise network traffic loads, AARNet operates high capacity peering links with various major content providers including the Australian ABC, Apple, Microsoft and Amazon.

== Supporting big science ==
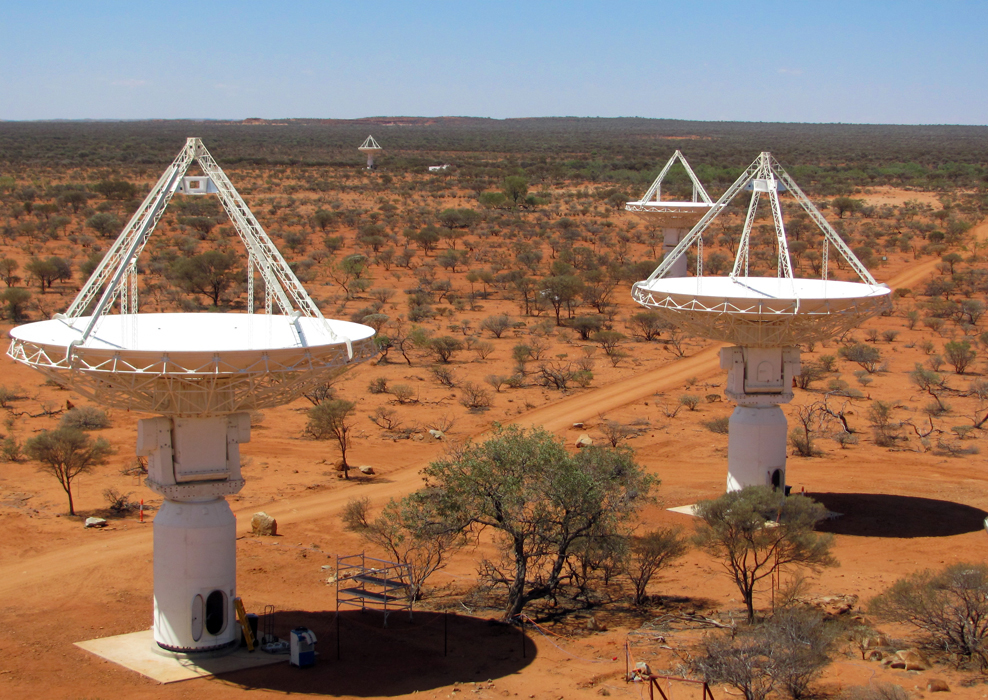
CSIRO's ASKAP antennas at the Murchison Radio-astronomy Observatory, Western Australia

A major application of the capacities of advanced research and education networks including AARNet has been to meet the needs of data-intensive research across a wide range of research disciplines, spanning the sciences and humanities. For example, it has interconnected major research instruments such as synchrotrons and telescopes in remote locations to high performance computer systems and researchers around the world, allowing astronomers in Europe to view the southern sky using telescopes in Australia or creating high resolution realtime video links between remote locations.

Most recently, AARNet has built a 100 Gbit/s wavelength-division multiplexing (WDM) optical fibre transmission system from Perth to Geraldton and on to the Murchison Radio-astronomy Observatory (MRO) in Western Australia in support of Australia's component of the international Square Kilometre Array project and the initial ASKAP telescope array at the MRO.
