= European Intellectual Property Review =

Cover of a 2012 issue of EIPR

The European Intellectual Property Review (EIPR) is a monthly law review published since 1978 by Sweet & Maxwell (now part of Thomson Reuters), that covers international intellectual property law. Its general editor since its 1978 inception has been Hugh Brett.

The earliest issues of EIPR, for October to December 1978 lack numbering; volume 1 begins with January 1979. Its initial publisher was ESC Publishing Ltd., subsequently acquired by Sweet & Maxwell Ltd., which Thomson Reuters later acquired.

== See also ==
- List of intellectual property law journals
