= IVEC =

iVEC
- Company type: Unincorporated joint venture
- Industry: High-performance computing
- Founded: 2000
- Headquarters: Perth, Western Australia, Australia
- Services: Supercomputing; Data storage; Cloud computing; Scientific visualization
- Number of employees: 40
- Website: iVEC.org

iVEC is the government-supported high-performance computing national facility located in Perth, Western Australia. iVEC supported researchers in Western Australia and across Australia through the Pawsey Centre and resources across the partner facilities. iVEC was rebranded to the Pawsey Supercomputing Centre in December 2014.

iVEC is an unincorporated joint venture between CSIRO, Curtin University, Edith Cowan University, Murdoch University and the University of Western Australia. Funding comes from the joint venture partners, the Western Australian Government and the Australian Government. iVEC services are free to members of the joint venture. Free access to supercomputers is also available to researchers across Australia via a competitive merit process. Services are also provided to industry and government.

iVEC provides infrastructure to support a computational research workflow. This includes supercomputers and cloud computing, data storage and visualisation. The infrastructure is located at the joint venture members, linked by a dedicated high speed network.

iVEC is an integral component of the Australian Square Kilometre Array Pathfinder (ASKAP) and Murchison Widefield Array (MWA) radio astronomy telescopes. A dedicated network links the telescopes directly to the Pawsey Supercomputing Centre, where the data is processed, stored and remotely visualised. This network is operated by AARNet, with the Perth-Geraldton link funded by the Australian Government Regional Blackspot Program.

== History ==
IVEC was established in June 2000 as an unincorporated joint venture among Central TAFE, the Commonwealth Scientific and Industrial Research Organisation (CSIRO), Curtin University and The University of Western Australia (UWA). The Government of Western Australian was a major supporter of the venture, contributing $1 million cash that leveraged $1 million of Commonwealth funding through iVEC becoming a partner in the Australian Partnership for Advanced Computing (APAC). The IVEC partners also contributed $1 million. The Premier of Western Australia officially opened IVEC in May 2002. IVEC was an acronym; the Interactive Virtual Environments Centre.

The Premier of Western Australia announced in July 2005 that $3.1 million of State Government funds had been allocated to continue funding IVEC, in addition to almost $1.3 million from the partners and $1.2 million from APAC. This commitment was used to leverage $2.4 million of additional cash from the Australian Research Council (ARC), UWA and CSIRO for supercomputing hardware. This includes $1.3 million for a Cray XT3 from the ARC under the name Western Australian Supercomputer Program. IVEC was renamed to iVEC, with the acronym no longer being used.

In May 2006, the State Treasurer, The Hon. Eric Ripper, announced that the WA Government had set aside $1.95 million per year over the next four years for iVEC. The iVEC partners, with Edith Cowan University joining and Central TAFE withdrawing, agreed to contribute nearly $1.9 million over the same period.

As part of its Super Science Initiative announced in the May 2009 budget, the Australian Government allocated $80 million over the financial years 2009/10 to 2012/13 to iVEC to establish a petascale supercomputing facility (the Pawsey Centre) located at the Australian Resources Research Centre in Perth. The Western Australian Government subsequently funded iVEC through its Research Facilities Program to 2015 at ~$4 million per annum, and the joint venture partners contributed a similar total.

iVEC was renamed to the Pawsey Supercomputing Centre on 5 Dec 2014. The name change was to align the name of the joint venture with the facility created through the 2009-2013 Super Science funding.

On 14 May 2015 the Australian Government announced $5.668M funding for 2015-2016 for the Pawsey Supercomputing Centre. Also on 14 May 2015, the Western Australian Government announced funding for the Pawsey Supercomputing Centre at $4.1M in 2016-2017, $4.2M in 2017-2018, and $4.3M in 2018-2019. Some funding is also received from the Australian Government through other NCRIS projects such as NeCTAR and RDSI.

== Locations ==
The Pawsey Centre building is located in the western precinct of the Technology Park, in Kensington, Western Australia. This building houses the majority of the IT equipment.

iVEC (the Pawsey Supercomputing Centre) has staff located at all members of the joint venture. The headquarters are also in the Pawsey Centre building.

== Resources ==
Model - computer name	Processor type	No. of processors	Operation dates
Compaq SC40 - carlin	Alpha 21264	20	2001 - 2006
SGI Altix 3700 Bx2 - cognac	Intel Itanium 2 1.5 GHz	192	2005 - 2011
Cray XT3 - marron	AMD Opteron dual-core 2.6 GHz	164 (328 cores)	2006 - 2011
SGI Altix XE 1300 - xe	Intel Xeon	512 cores	2008 - 2011
HP ProLiant cluster - epic	Intel Xeon Westmere-EP X5660 2.8 GHz	9,600 cores	2011 - 2014
SGI - fornax	Intel Xeon Westmere-EP X5650 2.66 GHz CPU, NVidia C2075 GPU	96 GPUs	2012 - 2015
Cray XC40 - magnus	Intel Xeon Haswell E5-2690v3 2.6 GHz	35,712 cores	2013 -
Cray XC30 - galaxy	Intel Xeon Ivy Bridge E5-2690v2 3.0 GHz	9,440 cores, 64 GPUs	2013 -
SGI UV2000 - zythos	Intel Xeon Sandy Bridge E5-4610 2.4 GHz, NVidia K20 GPU	264 cores, 4 GPUs	2013 -

== Pawsey Centre ==
The Pawsey Centre building comprises a purpose-built data centre, housing supercomputers and associated infrastructure at Kensington, Western Australia. The Pawsey Centre is owned by CSIRO and operated by the joint venture. It is located approximately six kilometres from the Perth central business district. The Pawsey Centre was named after the Australian radio astronomer Joseph Lade Pawsey.

=== Funding ===
The $80 million of funding for the Pawsey Centre was announced in the May 2009 Federal Budget under the Super Science Initiative. The Super Science Inititiative addresses priority areas from the 2008 Strategic Roadmap for Australian Research Infrastructure. The funding comes from the Education Investment Fund (EIF) which is for strategic investment in research infrastructure. Project funding was awarded to CSIRO to build and commission the Pawsey Centre in trust for iVEC, the manager of the Pawsey Centre. The Super Science Initiative also funded $50 million towards high performance computing at the National Computational Infrastructure in Canberra.

The Pawsey Centre addresses the two priority areas of astronomy and geosciences as defined in the 2008 Strategic Roadmap for Australian Research Infrastructure. It complements the National Compute Infrastructure, whose priority areas are climate science, earth systems and national water management.

=== Cooling ===
The Pawsey Centre was designed to use traditional water cooling towers as a reliable and cheap way to cool the supercomputers and other ICT equipment.

Additional cooling technology is in use at the Pawsey Centre to reduce its environmental impact. This was achieved through the Sustainable Energy for the Square Kilometre Array (SESKA) geothermal project. The process involves pumping water with an ambient temperature of around 21 °C from the Mullaloo aquifer through an above-ground heat exchanger to provide the necessary cooling effect for the supercomputer, then re-injecting the water back into the aquifer. CSIRO estimates that using groundwater cooling to cool the supercomputer saves approximately 38.5 million litres of water every year, compared with using conventional cooling towers.

== See also ==
- Melbourne Bioinformatics
- National Computational Infrastructure
- Pawsey Supercomputing Centre
- Western Australian Regional Computing Centre
