= Australian Partnership for Advanced Computing =

The Australian Partnership for Advanced Computing (APAC) was an Australian organisation established in 1998 to provide advanced computing and grid infrastructure for Australian research communities. APAC was established under the Systemic Infrastructure Initiative objective of the Australian Government's Backing Australia's Ability innovation plan. The Australian National University was the host institution for APAC.

In 2007, APAC was replaced by the Platforms for Collaboration (PfC) capability 5.16 of the National Collaborative Research Infrastructure Strategy (NCRIS). The APAC National Facility was replaced with the National Computational Infrastructure component of PfC. The APAC Grid program was replaced with the Interoperation and Collaboration Infrastructure (ICI) component of PfC.

== APAC Partners ==
1. AC3 - Australian Centre for Advanced Computing and Communications in NSW
2. ANU - The Australian National University
3. CSIRO
4. iVEC - Organisation for advanced computing in Western Australia
5. QCIF - Queensland Cyber Infrastructure Foundation
6. SAPAC - South Australian Partnership for Advanced Computing
7. TPAC - University of Tasmania acting as host for the Tasmanian Partnership for Advanced Computing
8. VPAC - Victorian Partnership for Advanced Computing

== APAC Programs ==
- APAC National Facility
  - The APAC National facility hosted a SGI Altix 3700 Bx2, with 1,680 Intel Itanium 2 processors, known as the "ac". This was ranked 26th in the world in the June 2005 Top500 list.
- APAC Computational Tools & Techniques (CT&T)
- APAC Grid
- Education, Outreach and Training (EOT)
