= Pawsey Supercomputing Centre =

HPC facility in Perth, Western Australia

Pawsey Supercomputing Centre (PSC)
- Company type: Unincorporated joint venture
- Industry: High-performance computing
- Predecessor: iVEC; Interactive Virtual Environments Centre
- Founded: iVec: 2000; Pawsey: 2014
- Headquarters: 31.992652°S 115.883621°E, Kensington, Perth, Western Australia 6151, Australia
- Area served: Australia
- Services: Supercomputing; Data Storage; Cloud Computing; Scientific Visualization
- Number of employees: 40
- Website: pawsey.org.au

The Pawsey Supercomputing Centre (PSC) is a government-supported high-performance computing national facility located in Perth, Western Australia. Pawsey supports researchers in Western Australia and across Australia.

Pawsey is an unincorporated joint venture between the CSIRO, Curtin University, Edith Cowan University, Murdoch University and the University of Western Australia. Funding comes from the joint venture partners, the Western Australian Government and the Australian Government. Pawsey services are free to members of the joint venture. Free access to supercomputers is also available to researchers across Australia via a competitive merit process. Services are also provided to industry and government.

Pawsey provides infrastructure to support a computational research workflow. This includes supercomputers and cloud computing, data storage and visualisation. The infrastructure is located at the joint venture members, linked by a dedicated high speed network.

Pawsey is an integral component of the Australian Square Kilometre Array Pathfinder (ASKAP) and the Murchison Widefield Array (MWA) radio astronomy telescopes. A dedicated network links the telescopes directly to the Pawsey Centre, where the data is processed, stored and remotely visualised. This network is operated by AARNet, with the Perth-Geraldton link funded by the Australian Government Regional Blackspot Program.

== History ==
The Pawsey Supercomputing Centre is the continuation of iVEC, an organisation delivering advanced computing resources to Western Australian researchers. iVEC was renamed to the Pawsey Supercomputing Centre on 5 December 2014. As part of its Super Science Initiative announced in the May 2009 budget, the Australian Government allocated A$80 million, equivalent to A$109.1 million in 2022, over the financial years 2009/10 to 2012/13 to iVEC to establish a petascale supercomputing facility (the Pawsey Centre) located at the Australian Resources Research Centre in Perth. The Western Australian Government subsequently funded iVEC/Pawsey through its Research Facilities Program to 2015 at about $4 million per annum, and the joint venture partners contributed a similar total.

On 14 May 2015 the Australian Government announced $5.668M funding for 2015–2016 for the Pawsey Supercomputing Centre. Also on 14 May 2015, the Western Australian Government announced funding for the Pawsey Supercomputing Centre at $4.1M in 2016–2017, $4.2M in 2017–2018, and $4.3M in 2018–2019. Some funding is also received from the Australian Government through other NCRIS projects such as NeCTAR and RDSI.

== Notable staff ==
- John Langoulant – chair
- Mark Stickells – director

== Locations ==
The Pawsey Centre building is located in the western precinct of the Technology Park, in Kensington, Western Australia. This building houses the majority of the IT equipment.

The Pawsey Supercomputing Centre has staff located at all members of the joint venture. The headquarters are also in the Pawsey Centre building.

== Resources ==
Model - computer name	Processor type	No. of processors	Operation dates
Eight cabinet HPE Cray EX – Setonix	3rd generation AMD EPYC CPU	Over 200,000 cores and 750 AMD GPUs at completion of phase 2	2022 -
Cray XC40 - magnus	Intel Xeon Haswell E5-2690v3 2.6 GHz	35,712 cores	2013 -
Cray XC30 - galaxy	Intel Xeon Ivy Bridge E5-2690v2 3.0 GHz	9,440 cores, 64 GPUs	2013 -
HPE cluster – zeus	Intel Xeon Broadwell E5-2680v4 2.4 GHz	2,576 cores	2017 -
SGI UV2000 - zythos	Intel Xeon Sandy Bridge E5-4610 2.4 GHz, NVidia K20 GPU	264 cores, 4 GPUs	2013 - 2018
SGI - fornax	Intel Xeon Westmere-EP X5650 2.66 GHz CPU, NVidia C2075 GPU	96 GPUs	2012 - 2015
HP ProLiant cluster – epic	Intel Xeon Westmere-EP X5660 2.8 GHz	9,600 cores	2011 - 2014

== Pawsey Centre ==
The Pawsey Centre building comprises a purpose-built data centre, housing supercomputers and associated infrastructure at Kensington, Western Australia. The Pawsey Centre is owned by CSIRO and operated by the joint venture. It is located approximately six kilometres from the Perth central business district. The Pawsey Centre was named after the Australian radio astronomer Joseph Lade Pawsey.

=== Funding ===
The $80 million of funding for the Pawsey Centre was announced in the May 2009 Federal Budget under the Super Science Initiative. The Super Science Inititiative addresses priority areas from the 2008 Strategic Roadmap for Australian Research Infrastructure. The funding comes from the Education Investment Fund (EIF) which is for strategic investment in research infrastructure. Project funding was awarded to CSIRO to build and commission the Pawsey Centre in trust for iVEC, the manager of the Pawsey Centre. The Super Science Initiative also funded $50 million towards high performance computing at the National Computational Infrastructure in Canberra.

The Pawsey Centre addresses the two priority areas of astronomy and geosciences as defined in the 2008 Strategic Roadmap for Australian Research Infrastructure. It complements the National Compute Infrastructure, whose priority areas are climate science, earth systems and national water management.

=== Cooling ===
The Pawsey Centre was designed to use traditional water cooling towers as a reliable and cheap way to cool the supercomputers and other ICT equipment.

Additional cooling technology is in use at the Pawsey Centre to reduce its environmental impact. This was achieved through the Sustainable Energy for the Square Kilometre Array (SESKA) geothermal project. The process involves pumping water with an ambient temperature of around 21 °C (70 °F) from the Mullaloo aquifer through an above-ground heat exchanger to provide the necessary cooling effect for the supercomputer, then re-injecting the water back into the aquifer. CSIRO estimates that using groundwater cooling to cool the supercomputer saves approximately 38.5 million litres (10.2 million US gallons) of water every year, compared with using conventional cooling towers.

== See also ==
- iVEC
- Melbourne Bioinformatics
- National Computational Infrastructure
- Western Australian Regional Computing Centre
