= Pavan =

Pavan may refer to:

- Pavan, alternate spelling of pavane, a slow 16th-century dance, or the musical form for such a dance
- Pavan (Hindu god), a god of wind in Hindu mythology and father of Hanuman
- Pavan, Iran, a village in Hamadan Province, Iran
- Pavan, Dahanu, a village in Maharashtra, India
- 18123 Pavan, a main belt asteroid
- Pavan (given name)
- Pavan (surname)

== See also ==
- Pavana (disambiguation)
- Pavane (disambiguation)
- Vayu (disambiguation), another name of the Hindu god
