= List of compositions by Tielman Susato =

This is a list of compositions by Tielman Susato.

== Instrumental music ==
Danserye (1551)

- Dance No. 1
- Dance No. 2
- Dance No. 3
- Dance No. 4
- Dance No. 5
- Dance No. 6
- Dance No. 7
- Dance No. 8
- Dance No. 9
- Dance No. 10
- Dance No. 11
- Dance No. 12
- Dance No. 13
- Ronde No. 1
- Ronde No. 2
- Ronde No. 3
- Ronde No. 4
- Ronde No. 5
- Ronde No. 6
- Dont vientcela
- Vostre gent corps
- Loing de tes jeulx
- La rosee du mois de may
- Sans avoir aultre
- Trop a regretz
- Je my leuay par ung matin
- Damours me plains
- Situte plains
- Pis ne me peult venir
- Ioyeulx recueil
- Sans la veoir cotent estre
- Le content est riche
- Plaisir vay plus
- Cuidez vous que dieu nous
- Ungiour viendra
- Mille regretz
- Craite & Espoir moppressent
- Qui belles amours a
- Accordez moy
- Dargent me plains
- Languir me fais en douleur
- Le bergier & la bergiere
- Tous mes amis
- Si par souffrir
- Puis quen januier
- The Battle Pavane

Luculentum theatrum musicum (1568 - A compilation of pieces by various composers)

For solo lute

- Fantasia prima. R. Viola
- Fantasia. Simon Gintzler
- Fantasia. Antonio Rotta
- Fantasia. Giovanni Paolo Paladino
- Fantasia. Guillaume Morlaye
- Fantasia. Giovanni Paolo Paladino
- Fantasia. Guillaume Morlaye
- Fantasia. Francesco da Milano
- Fantasia. Giovanni Paolo Paladino
- Fantasia. Francesco da Milano
- Fantasia. Giovanni Maria da Crema
- Fantasia. Francesco da Milano
- Fantasia. Guillaume Morlaye
- Fantasia. Francesco da Milano
- Fantasia. Francesco da Milano
- Fantasia.
- Fantasia. Bálint Bakfark
- Fantasia. Francesco da Milano
- Fantasia. Francesco da Milano
- Fantasia. Francesco da Milano
- Fantasia. Luys de Narváez
- O combien est. Doubtful Sandrin or Claudin de Sermisy
- Le mal qui sent.
- Vous perdés temps. Claudin de Sermisy
- Telz en mesdict. Mittantier
- Doulce me-moire. Sandrin
- Finy le bien. Pierre Certon
- C'est a grand tort. Thomas Crecquillon
- Languyr me fais. Claudin de Sermisy
- Si mon traveil. Sandrin
- Le dueil yssu. Pierre de Villiers
- Toutes les nuyct. Thomas Crecquillon
- Mais languyrai-je. Jacobus Clemens non Papa
- Qu'est il besoing
- Fault il qu'il soit
- Cessez mes yeux. Thomas Crecquillon
- Le content est riche. Claudin de Sermisy
- Je prens en gré. Jacobus Clemens non Papa
- Un gay bergier. Thomas Crecquillon
- Dolci suspiri
- Pour un plaisir. Thomas Crecquillon
- Si de present. Tielman Susato
- Venez venez.
- Je suis desheritée. Doubtful Lupus or Pierre Cadéac
- Damour me plains. Rogier Pathie
- Ce mois de may. Godard
- Canzon Mapolitano in tolledo.
- Sur la verdure.
- Or demourez.
- Mamye un jour. Pierre Certon
- Si purti guardo. Rogier Pathie
- Godt es mijn licht. Jacobus Clemens non Papa
- Responce.
- Susanne ung jour. Didier Lupi Second
- Que pleust a dieu. Verjus
- Si de nouveau. Joanne Verius
- Fortune allors. Pierre Certon
- Pour une helas. Thomas Crecquillon
- Tuta tutta saressa.
- Quando io penso al martire. Jacob Arcadelt
- O faccia puita mia.
- Martin menoit. Jacobus Clemens non Papa
- Anchor che col partire. Cipriano de Rore
- Si tu non mi voi.
- O sio potessi donna. Jacquet de Berchem
- La pastorella mia. Jacob Arcadelt
- Frisque et gaillard. Jacobus Clemens non Papa
- Adieu madame par amour.
- A demy mort. Jacobus Clemens non Papa
- Amour au ceur. Thomas Crecquillon
- Si me tenez. Thomas Crecquillon
- Or il ne m'est possible. Jacobus Clemens non Papa
- Misericorde. Jacobus Clemens non Papa
- Avecque vous. Orlande de Lassus
- Ardant amour. Orlande de Lassus
- Vray dieu disoit. Orlande de Lassus
- Du corps absnet. Orlande de Lassus
- En espoir vis. Orlande de Lassus
- En un leiu. Orlande de Lassus
- Bon jour mon ceur. Orlande de Lassus
- Las voulez vous/Alio modo. Orlande de Lassus
- Un doulx neny. Orlande de Lassus
- Ce faux amour. Orlande de Lassus
- O comme heureux. Orlande de Lassus
- La giustitia immortale. Cipriano de Rore
- Donna ch'ornata sete. Cipriano de Rore
- L'inconstantia channo. Cipriano de Rore
- Se'l mio sempre per voi. Cipriano de Rore
- Non gemme non fin oro. Cipriano de Rore
- Sous-pirs ardans. Jacob Arcadelt
- Si la dureza. Jacob Arcadelt
- Carita di signore. Cipriano de Rore
- Per pianto la mia carne. Orlande de Lassus
- Io cantrei d'amor. Cipriano de Rore
- Di tem-po in tempo. Cipriano de Rore
- Signor mio caro. Cipriano de Rore
- Qual è piu grand'o amore. Cipriano de Rore
- Non e ch'il duol mi scena. Cipriano de Rore
- A'i trepida. Jacob Arcadelt
- Or vien sa mamye. Clément Janequin
- La bella mita. Cipriano de Rore
- Qual anima. Nollet
- Non at sua amante. Bartolomeo Tromboncino
- Vita della mia vita. Philippe Verdelot
- Pensa domi quel giorno.
- Dormiendo i giorno. Philippe Verdelot
- Pis ne me peult venir. Thomas Crecquillon
- Susanne un jour/Alio modo/plus diminuée. Orlande de Lassus
- Je ne desire aymer. Thomas Crecquillon
- Tristitia obsedit me. Heinrich Isaac
- Descendit angelus.
- Paterpeccavi. Jacobus Clemens non Papa
- Stabat mater dolorosa. Josquin Desprez
- Benedicta es. Josquin Desprez

For two lutes

- Canti di voi le ladi. Hubert Naich
- Amor e gratioso.
- Burato.
- La Bataille. Clément Janequin
- Passomezo.
- Il suo saltarello.
- Chi passa. Filippo Azzaiolo
- O combien est. Doubtful Sandrin or Claudin de Sermisy
- Passomezo d'ytalye.

For solo lute

- Passomezo d'Italye.
- Passomezo.
- Passomezo. Nicolas Rans
- Gailliarda. Nicolas Rans
- Passomezo de Marck Antoine.
- Passomezo d'Ytalye.
- Gailliarda.
- Gailliarda.
- Passemezo d'Ytalye.
- La Gailliarde.
- Passomezo d'Ytalye.
- Contratenor.
- Passemezo Bassus.
- La Gailliarda.
- Padoana 'Romanisca'.
- La Gailliarda.
- Gailliarda 'La Royne d'Ecosse'.
- Gailliarda de Meller.
- 'Chi passa'.
- Gailliarda 'La Massengiere'.
- Gailliarda.
- Gailliarda 'La Vergiliana'.
- Gailliarda 'Si pour t'aymer'.
- Gailliarda 'Morette'.
- Gailliarda 'La Varionessa'.
- Gailliarda 'Brunette'.
- Gailliarda 'Wij sal mij troetelen'.
- Gailliarda 'Baisons nous belle'.
- Almande de Ungrie.
- Almande de Spiers.
- Almande 'Noseroit on dire' et reprinse.
- Almande 'Philippine' et reprinse.
- Almande 'de la rocha el fuso'.
- Almande 'smeechdelijn' et reprinse.
- Almande.
- Almande 'Nonette'.
- Almande 'Pouloingne' et reprinse.
- Brandt Champaigne.
- Branles des Bourgoignes.
- Branles des Bourgoignes.
- Branles des Bourgoignes.
- Branles des Bourgoignes.
- Branles des Bourgoignes.
- Branles des Bourgoignes.
- Branles des Bourgoignes.
- Branles des Bourgoignes.
- Branles des Bourgoignes.
- Bransles. Nicolas Rans

3 Dances

- Ronde
- Pavane "si pa souffrir"
- Saltarelle (Also known as "The Hupfauf")

Danza de Hércules

Susato Suite

1. Nachtanz Das ist ein hartes Scheiden
2. Ronde Es war einmal ein Mädchen
3. Schaefertanz Ohne Fels

== Choral music ==
=== Chansons ===
Le premier Livre des chansons à deux ou à troix parties (1544)

1. De jour en jour
2. Longtemps y a
3. De mon malheur
4. Se dire je l'osoye

L'Unziesme Livre contenant 29 Chansons Amoureuses (1549)
