= Pavan (given name) =

Pavan is a given name. Notable people with this name include:

- Pavan Duggal, Indian advocate in cyberlaw and e-commerce law
- Pavan Malhotra, Hindi film and television actor
- Pavan Ramdya (born 1979), American neuroscientist and bioengineer

== See also ==
- Pavan (surname)
