= Vayu (disambiguation) =

Vayu is a primary Hindu deity

Vayu may also refer to:

- Vayu-Vata, a Zoroastrian divinity
- Vayu Stuti, one of the most famous stutis (poems) composed by Sri Trivikrama Panditacharya
- Cyclone Vayu, a strong tropical cyclone in the 2019 North Indian Ocean cyclone season that affected Gujarat, India
- Tanishk-Vayu, a duo of Indian film score composers
- Vayu, Indian singer and lyricist
- Vayu (computer cluster), an Australian computer system located in Canberra, Australia

== See also ==
- Bayu (disambiguation)
- Pavan (disambiguation)
- Pavana (disambiguation)
