= Pavane (disambiguation) =

The pavane is a slow Renaissance dance.

Pavane may also refer to:

- musical compositions related to the dance such as:
  - Pavane, a composition for orchestra and optional chorus by the French composer Gabriel Fauré
  - Pavane pour une infante défunte, a composition by the French composer Maurice Ravel
  - The Battle Pavane, a composition by Tielman Susato
- Pavane (novel), an alternate history science fiction novel by Keith Roberts
- Pavane (film), 2026 South Korean romantic drama film

== See also ==
- Pavan (disambiguation)
- Pavana (disambiguation)
