= Bayu (name) =

- Pronunciation: /ˈbaɪ.uː/ Hindustani: [vɑːju] Indonesian: [ˈbaju] Malay: [ˈbaju] Sanskrit: [ʋaːjʊ]
- Gender: Male

Origin
- Origin: Sanskrit
- Meaning: Wind, Air, Breath
- Region of origin: India

Bayu is a male given name. It is the Malay form of the originally Sanskrit: वायु (IAST: Vāyu). The word vāyu is sometimes used generically in the sense of the physical air or wind.

Bayu's popularity has varied. In Indonesia, the name is included in the top 101 most commonly used names, ranking 42nd, and also is included in the Great Dictionary of the Indonesian Language. It is also popular in Ethiopia and quite familiar in India, Nigeria, Saudi Arabia, United Arab Emirates, Malaysia and Papua New Guinea.

== Etymology ==
Vayu (Sanskrit pronunciation: [ʋaːjʊ], Sanskrit: वायु, IAST: Vāyu), also known as Vata and Pavana, is the Hindu god of the winds as well as the divine messenger of the gods. In the Vedic scriptures, Vayu is an important deity and is closely associated with Indra, the king of gods. He is mentioned to be born from the breath of Supreme Being Vishvapurusha and also the first one to drink Soma.

The word for air (vāyu) or wind (pavana) is one of the classical elements in Hinduism. The Sanskrit word Vāta literally means 'blown'; Vāyu, 'blower' and Prāna, 'breathing' (viz. the breath of life, cf. the *an- in animate). Hence, the primary referent of the word is the 'deity of life', who is sometimes for clarity referred to as Mukhya-Vāyu (the chief Vayu) or Mukhya Prāna (the chief of life force or vital force).

Sometimes the word vāyu, which is more generally used in the sense of the physical air or wind, is used as a synonym for prāna. Vāta, an additional name for the deity Vayu, is the root of vātāvaranam, the Sanskrit and Hindi term for 'atmosphere'.

== Notable people ==
- Aji Bayu Putra (born 1993), Indonesian footballer
- Ario Bayu (born 1985), Indonesian actor
- Bayu Ayele (born 1949), Ethiopian boxer
- Bayu Fiqri (born 2001), Indonesian footballer
- Bayu Gatra (born 1991), Indonesian footballer
- I Gusti Bayu Sutha (born 1977), Indonesian footballer
- Malik Ibrahim Bayu (died 1353), legendary Sufi saint-warrior who arrived in South Bihar in the 14th century
- Bayu Nugroho (born 1992), Indonesian footballer
- Krisna Bayu (born 1974), Indonesian judoka
- Krisna Bayu Otto (born 1999), Indonesian footballer
- Bayu Pradana (born 1991), Indonesian footballer
- Thomas Ryan Bayu (born 1991), Indonesian footballer

== Fictional characters ==
- Bayu, a character from American TV series Conan the Adventurer (1997)
- Bayu, the main character from Killers (2014)
- Bayu, the main character from the 2009 film Garuda in My Heart
- Bayu, a character from the 2021 film Geez & Ann
- Bayu, the main character from Indonesian TV series The World Without Commas
- Bayu, the main character from Indonesian TV series Bayu Loves Luna
- Bayu, a character from Indonesian soap opera Uncomplicated Love
- Bayu, a character from Indonesian soap opera Cinderella (Is Love Just a Dream?)
- Dr. Bayu, a character from Indonesian TV series Substitute Husband

== See also ==
- Bayu (disambiguation)
