= Criminal Justice (Offences Relating to Information Systems) Act 2017 =

The Criminal Justice (Offences Relating to Information Systems) Act 2017 is an act of the Oireachtas dealing with cybercrime.

== Previous legislation ==
Previous laws dealing with computer crime in Ireland were the Criminal Damage Act 1991 and Criminal Justice (Theft and Fraud Offences Act) 2001. Neither of these were specifically intended to deal with computer crime.

In May 2017, Tánaiste and Minister for Justice Frances Fitzgerald brought forward the legislation.

== Offences ==
The act introduces new offences relating to:

- Unauthorised access to data systems
- Interference with information systems or data on said systems
- Interception of transmission of data to or from an information system
- The use of tools to facilitate such offences

The Act amends the Criminal Damage Act 1991, the Bail Act 1997 and Criminal Justice Act 2011.

== See also ==
- General Data Protection Regulation
- NIS Directive
