= QFAB Bioinformatics =

Academic organisation in Australia

Queensland Facility for Advanced Bioinformatics
- Abbreviation: QFAB Bioinformatics
- Formation: 2007
- Type: academic not-for-profit
- Headquarters: Institute for Molecular Bioscience; University of Queensland; Brisbane
- Region served: Australia
- Director: Dr Dominique Gorse
- Website: qfab.org

QFAB Bioinformatics is a Queensland-based organisation concerned with the provision of resources in bioinformatics, biostatistics and specialised computing platforms. QFAB operates Australia-wide and is a key contributor to the EMBL Australia Bioinformatics Resource.

== History ==
QFAB was established in 2007, with funding from the Queensland Government's National and International Research Alliances Program, as a joint venture between The University of Queensland, Queensland University of Technology, Griffith University, CSIRO's Australian eHealth Research Centre and the Queensland Government's Department of Agriculture, Fisheries and Forestry.

Mark Ragan from the Institute of Molecular Bioscience (IMB) and Anthony Maeder from the Australian eHealth Research Centre led QFAB's establishment and appointed Jeremy Barker as CEO (2007–2014) to address three critical issues then facing bioinformatics in Queensland:

1. integrated data and high-performance computing in a secure environment
2. affordable network bandwidth
3. access to expert personnel

In 2015, Dominique Gorse became CEO of QFAB and led the strategic alliance with QCIF, the Queensland Cyber Infrastructure Foundation; the two organisations merged in April 2016. QCIF operates significant high-performance computing, cloud computing and data storage resources, is part of the national eResearch infrastructure.

== Queensland Cyber Infrastructure Foundation ==
QFAB Bioinformatics is a unit of the Queensland Cyber Infrastructure Foundation (QCIF), a not-for-profit member-based organisation.

=== Members ===
- Central Queensland University
- Griffith University
- James Cook University
- Queensland University of Technology
- The University of Queensland
- University of Southern Queensland

=== Affiliate member ===
- University of the Sunshine Coast

== Galaxy Australia ==
QFAB and QCIF, together with the University of Melbourne's Melbourne Bioinformatics, and the University of Queensland's Research Computing Centre jointly built and operate Galaxy Australia, which is a major feature of the Genomics Virtual Laboratory, based on the Galaxy (computational biology) scientific workflow system.
