= Bayu =

Bayu may refer to:

== People ==
- Bayu (name), a male given name originating in Sanskrit, and a list of people and characters with that name
- Bayu Baev (born 1941), Bulgarian Olympic wrestler

=== Fictional characters ===
- Bayu, a character from American TV series Conan the Adventurer (1997 TV series)

== Places ==
- Bayu, California, US; a former Maidu settlement in Butte County
- Bayu (state constituency), a state constituency in Kedah, Malaysia
- Bayu-Undan to Darwin Pipeline, a multi-diameter subsea gas export pipeline between Timor-Leste and Australia
- Estadio El Bayu (Spanish: The Bayu Stadium), Pola de Siero, Siero, Asturias, Spain; a soccer stadium
- Bāyú (巴渝), a touristic name for Chongqing, Sichuan, China; see Twelve Views of Bayu

== Other uses ==
- El Bayú de la Mañana (commonly: El Bayú; Spanish: The Bayú), Puerto Rican morning radio show
- Bayu Cinta Luna, an Indonesian TV series
- Bayu Indonesia, a former airline in Indonesia

== See also ==
- Bayou (disambiguation)
- Vayu (disambiguation)
