= Pawan =

Pawan may refer to:

- Pawan (actor) (born 1971), Indian actor
- Joseph Lennox Pawan (born 1887), Trinidadian bacteriologist and virologist
- Pawan Kalyan (born 1971), Indian actor and director in Telugu cinema deputy chief minister of state
- Pawan Kumar (director) (born 1982), Indian film director, actor, producer, and screenwriter in Kannada cinema
- Pawan Kumar Chamling (born 1950), Longest served Chief Minister of the India from state of Sikkim
- Operation Pawan, 1987

== See also ==
- Pavan (disambiguation)
