= Moresi =

Moresi is an Italian surname. Notable people with the surname include:

- Attilio Moresi (1937–1993), Swiss cyclist
- Fernando Moresi (born 1970), Argentine field hockey player
- Louis Moresi (born 1965), British geophysicist
- Ludovico Moresi (born 1980), Italian footballer
