= MySecureCyberspace =

MySecureCyberspace began in 2003 as an initiative by Carnegie Mellon CyLab and the Information Networking Institute to educate the public about computer security, network security and Internet safety. Inspired by the National Strategy to Secure Cyberspace, the initiative empowers users to secure their part of cyberspace.

The initiative created a web portal at www.MySecureCyberspace.com that customized information to users about cybersecurity threats, in addition to tactical countermeasures and legal, ethical, and privacy issues. For example, using the Secure My Cyberspace tool on the web portal, a user could enter an online activity, such as email, and receive an explanation of common threats and issues associated with that activity, such as spam and phishing scams, and then receive advice on how to resolve those problems. As a web portal, MySecureCyberspace served people of all ages and roles, but certain areas of the web portal contained articles and resources specifically for parents, educators and children.

From 2005 to 2012, MySecureCyberspace provided a Flash-based interactive game designed for elementary school children at www.CarnegieCyberAcademy.com called Carnegie Cadets that reinforced principles of safe and responsible computing. Enriched with content and classroom material that complied with the National Educational Technology Standards, the game could be integrated into fourth and fifth grade curricula. The Carnegie Cyber Academy website and supporting materials remain available, but the game is not compatible with current operating systems.

== History ==
Through a grant from the National Science Foundation, CyLab and the Information Networking Institute launched the web portal in April 2005, which included a prototype of the online Carnegie Cadets game.

Carnegie Cadets:The MySecureCyberspace Game and its companion website officially launched on October 26, 2007 during a demonstration at J.H. Brooks Elementary School in Pittsburgh. PA Attorney General Tom Corbett attended the kickoff event and endorsed the game.

== Recognition ==
- Finalist status for the 2009 Japan Prize
- Silver Awards of Distinction, Education and Children's Audience categories, 2009 Communicator Awards
- Merit Award, Online Communication, The Pittsburgh Chapter of the Society for Technical Communication, May 2007
