= Jingbo Wang =

Australian quantum physicist

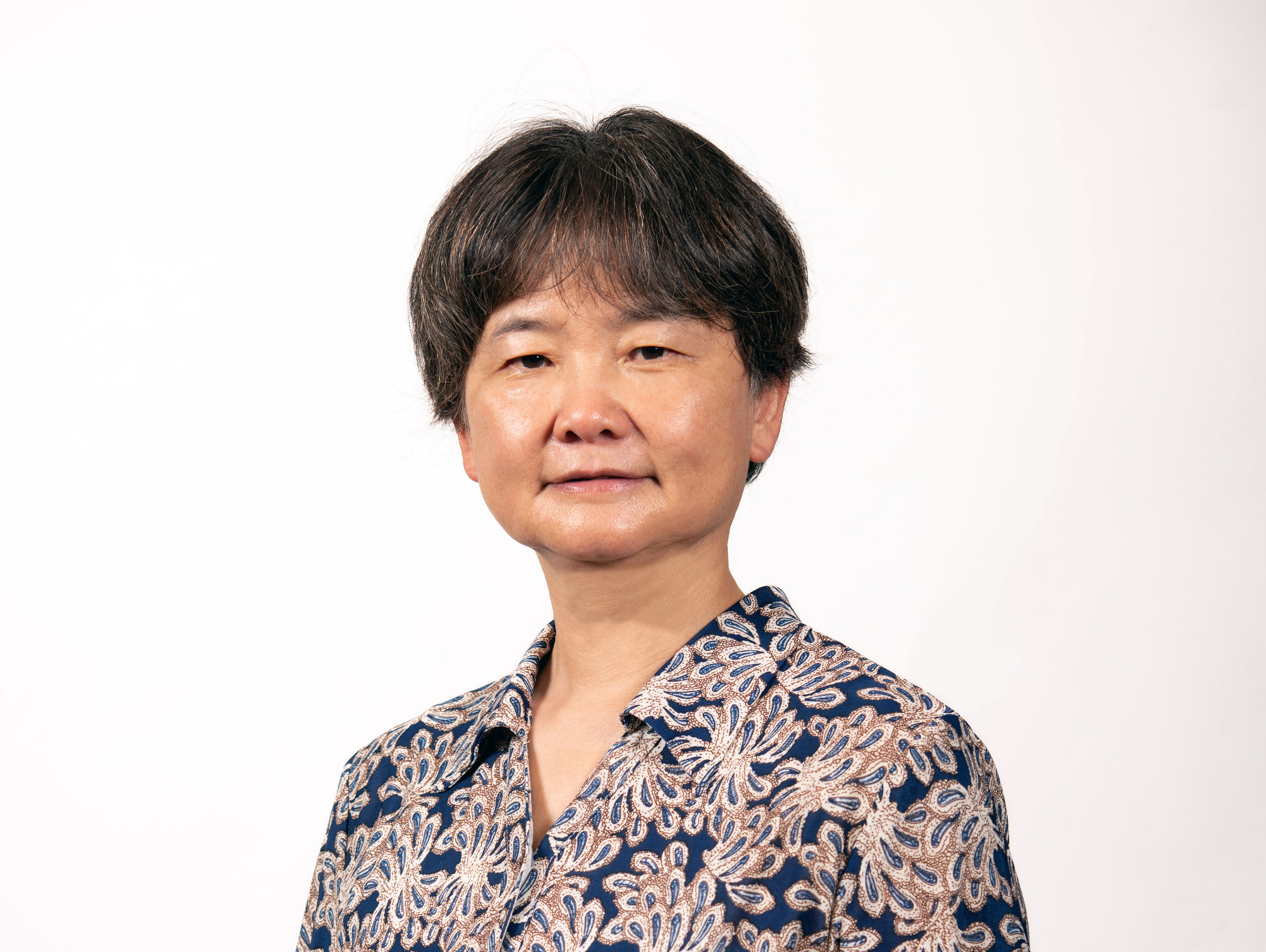
- Education: PhD, Quantum Physics, University of Adelaide
- Occupations: Professor, Head of Physics Department, University of Western Australia

Jingbo Wang is an Australian quantum physicist working in the area of quantum simulation, quantum algorithms, and quantum information science.

== Education ==
Wang grew up in China and completed her undergraduate studies at Sichuan University and, following this, won a scholarship to complete her PhD at the University of Adelaide.

Wang received her PhD in 1989 and her thesis was entitled: Non-adiabatic dynamics of excited states of molecular oxygen (1989).

== Academic career ==
Wang is currently a Professor and Head of the Physics Department at the University of Western Australia. She directs the QUISA (Quantum Information, Simulation and Algorithms) Research Centre, which aims to foster collaboration and entrepreneurship, bringing together academic staff, research students, government and industrial partners to develop innovative quantum solutions to tackle otherwise intractable problems and complex phenomena. Professor Wang is also the Chair of Australian Institute of Physics (WA Branch).

Her team carried out research involving especially single and multi-particle quantum walks, demonstrating their power in analyzing complex networks, in identifying topological similarities in complex systems, in image processing and machine learning, and in optimizing combinatorial problems. They have also obtained highly efficient quantum circuits to implement quantum algorithms of practical importance.

In her work Wang also uses the Pawsey Supercomputing Centre which she uses to simulate the behaviour of prototype quantum computers, in doing this Wang, and her team, have been able to develop efficient quantum algorithms for machine learning and solve combinatorial optimisation problems.

== Honours and recognition ==
- Vice-Chancellor's Award for Research Mentorship, The University of Western Australia (2022)
- Fellow, Australian Institute of Physics (2020)
- WA Dennis Moore Award for achievements in quantum computing research, Australian Computer Society (2018)

== Books ==
- Josh Izaac and Jingbo Wang, Computational Quantum Mechanics, Springer (2018)
- Kia Manouchehri and Jingbo Wang, Physical Implementation of Quantum Walks, Springer (2014)
