= Andrew Rohl =

Australian chemist

- Born: 1966 (age 59–60); Stockport, UK
- Citizenship: Australian
- Occupation: Academic / Scientist
- Awards: Inaugural Dennis Moore Orator 2013; WAITTA 2014 Achiever of the Year; Fellow, Australian Computer Society (elected 2017)
- Scientific career
- Fields: Chemistry, Computer Science and Data Science
- Institutions: Curtin University
- Website: Curtin University Staff Page

Andrew Rohl (born 1966) is a computational chemist, computer scientist and data scientist. He is an expert in the application of supercomputing and computer simulation technologies in materials chemistry, particularly the computer simulation of surfaces.

Rohl graduated from The University of Western Australia in 1987 with 1st Class Honours in Physical and Organic Chemistry. He completed a D. Phil in inorganic chemistry at Oxford University in 1991. He undertook postdoctoral work at the Royal Institution of Great Britain modelling the interactions between organic molecules and inorganic surfaces. This project required the development of the computer code MARVIN for modelling periodic surfaces, and this code is still in widespread use. A second postdoc at Oxford University followed.

Rohl was appointed a professor of Computational Science at Curtin University in 2007 and a John Curtin Distinguished Professor in 2019. He was seconded as executive director of the high-performance computing facility iVEC between 2004 and 2012 and Director of the Curtin Institute for Computation 2015–2020. He is a research director of the ARC Industrial Training Centre for Transforming Maintenance through Data Science and currently Head of the School of Electrical Engineering, Computing and Mathematical Sciences at Curtin University.

== Honors and awards ==
- Inaugural Dennis Moore Orator 2013
- WAITTA 2014 Achiever of the Year
- Fellow, Australian Computer Society (elected 2017)
