= Louis Moresi =

Louis-Noël Moresi
- Born: 30 October 1965 (age 60); London, England
- Education: Clare College, Cambridge
- Scientific career
- Fields: computer science, geophysics
- Workplaces: Kodak; Caltech; CSIRO; Monash University; Melbourne University; ANU]

Louis-Noël Moresi FAA (born 30 October 1965) is a Professor of Computational Mathematics & Geophysics at The Australian National University. He has deeply influenced the understanding of the Geophysics community through his own research as well as providing software for the community to use.

== Early career ==
The London-born Moresi began his scientific career at Kodak as a research assistant in 1985 where he worked with Dr John Goddard on the synthesis of stabilizers (anti-oxidants) for yellow dyes in photographic emulsions. In the same year, he began undergraduate studies at Clare College, Cambridge at the University of Cambridge. There he completed a Natural Sciences Tripos in 1988, with final year options in Seismology, Physics of the Earth and Environmental Science, taking classes under Dan McKenzie. In his last year he received the Horn Prize for his results in his final examinations.

From 1988 to 1992, he completed his doctoral studies in the Department of Earth Sciences at the University of Oxford. He focused his PhD thesis on the influence of mantle convection on surface observables such as Topography and Geoid. His particular emphasis was on the role of temperature-dependent viscosity and partial melting for both Earth and Venus.

== Employment ==
From 1992 to 1995 he worked as a fellow in geophysics at Caltech. There he worked with Mike Gurnis on 3D dynamic models of Subduction in the North West Pacific Ocean as well as mantle convection in Earth and Venus with Slava Solomatov. After this he worked as a postdoctoral fellow at the Research School of Earth Sciences at ANU until 1997. Then he moved to Perth where he worked for CSIRO in the division of exploration and mining as a senior research scientist. There he studied large-scale continental deformation interacting with mantle convection.

In 2002 he moved to Monash University, where he was a professor as well as the co-director of Monash Cluster Computing, a parallel computing research centre. He was on the Australian Research Council College of Experts from 2012-2014. In 2014, he moved to Melbourne University through the Research at Melbourne Accelerator Program as a professor of geophysics. In 2019 he moved back to The Australian National University Research School of Earth Sciences as a Professor of Geophysics.

== Software development ==
It was during Moresi's time at Caltech that he wrote the popular mantle convection software program call Citcom. This is a 2D and 3D Eulerian Finite Element code which is designed to solve problems with extremely large variations in viscosity. Though it was originally a Cartesian serial code, there are currently many versions, including a spherical parallel version called CitComS (see Citcom for code's history).

During his time at CSIRO, he reworked Citcom using the Particle-in-cell approach and created a new program called Ellipsis. Having lagrangian integration points meant that the scientist using the code could track history and material properties through time. This allowed complex rheologies and geometries to be modelled easily and flexibly. Though Ellipsis only worked in 2D and in serial, it was extremely popular in the geophysics community.

Moresi, in partnership with the Victorian Partnership for Advanced Computing, and then later with AuScope continues to develop a parallel 3D version of Ellipsis called Underworld. He is the Program Directory of AuScope Simulation and Modelling (Australian national geoscience infrastructure program funded through NCRIS.

== Awards and recognition ==
Moresi was elected a Fellow of the Royal Astronomical Society in 2000. Moresi was elected a Fellow of the American Geophysical Union in 2017. Moresi was elected a Fellow of the Australian Academy of Science in 2023.
