= Sean Smith (chemist) =

New Zealand computational chemist

- Occupation: Computational chemist

Academic background
- Education: University of Canterbury
- Thesis: Experimental and theoretical studies of ion-molecule reactions (1989)

Academic work
- Institutions: University of Queensland (1993-2011); Oak Ridge National Laboratory (2011-2013); University of New South Wales (2014-2017); NCI Australia (2018-2024); Australian National University (2018-2024)

Sean Smith is a computational chemist from New Zealand.

== Education and research ==
Smith received a BSc and PhD in chemistry at University of Canterbury in Christchurch, New Zealand before postdoctoral work at University of California, Berkeley (1991-1993) and the University of Göttingen (Humboldt Fellow 1989–1991).

In 1993 he started work at the University of Queensland, eventually heading up the Computational Reaction Dynamics Group before moving on to Oak Ridge National Laboratory in 2011 where he was the director of the Center for Nanophase Materials Sciences. After leaving Oak Ridge in 2013 Smith moved to the University of New South Wales where he founded the Integrated Materials Design Centre.

Smith left the University of New South Wales at the end of 2017 to become director of NCI Australia and professor of computational nanomaterials science and technology at Australian National University. Sean left NCI Australia and Australian National University in December 2024 after the University "lost trust in his leadership".

== Awards and honours ==
- Fellow of the Institution of Chemical Engineers (2015)
- Bessel Research Award of the German Alexander von Humboldt Foundation (2006)
- Fellow of the American Association for the Advancement of Science (2012)
- Fellow of the Royal Australian Chemical Institute (1998)
- Le Fevre Memorial Prize of the Australian Academy of Science (1998)
- Rennie Memorial Medal of the Royal Australian Chemical Institute (1994)

== Selected publications ==
- Yang, Hua Gui; Sun, Cheng Hua; Qiao, Shi Zhang; Zou, Jin; Liu, Gang; Smith, Sean Campbell; Cheng, Hui Ming; Lu, Gao Qing (May 2008). "Anatase TiO2 single crystals with a large percentage of reactive facets". Nature. 453 (7195): 638–641. Bibcode:2008Natur.453..638Y. doi:10.1038/nature06964. hdl:10072/60737. ISSN 1476-4687. PMID 18509440. S2CID 205213341.
- Gilbert, Robert G. (1990). Theory of unimolecular and recombination reactions. Sean C. Smith. Oxford: Blackwell Scientific Publications. ISBN 0-632-02749-5. OCLC 20931842.
- Ouyang, Defang; Smith, Sean C., eds. (2015). Computational pharmaceutics : application of molecular modeling in drug delivery. Chichester, West Sussex, United Kingdom. doi:10.1002/9781118573983. ISBN 978-1-118-57396-9. OCLC 900159092.
- Liu, Gang; Niu, Ping; Sun, Chenghua; Smith, Sean C.; Chen, Zhigang; Lu, Gao Qing (Max); Cheng, Hui-Ming (25 August 2010). "Unique Electronic Structure Induced High Photoreactivity of Sulfur-Doped Graphitic C 3 N 4". Journal of the American Chemical Society. 132 (33): 11642–11648. doi:10.1021/ja103798k. ISSN 0002-7863. PMID 20681594.
- Yang, Hua Gui; Liu, Gang; Qiao, Shi Zhang; Sun, Cheng Hua; Jin, Yong Gang; Smith, Sean Campbell; Zou, Jin; Cheng, Hui Ming; Lu, Gao Qing (Max) (25 March 2009). "Solvothermal Synthesis and Photoreactivity of Anatase TiO 2 Nanosheets with Dominant {001} Facets". Journal of the American Chemical Society. 131 (11): 4078–4083. doi:10.1021/ja808790p. ISSN 0002-7863. PMID 19249825.
- Zheng, Yao; Jiao, Yan; Chen, Jun; Liu, Jian; Liang, Ji; Du, Aijun; Zhang, Weimin; Zhu, Zhonghua; Smith, Sean C.; Jaroniec, Mietek; Lu, Gao Qing (Max); Qiao, Shi Zhang (21 December 2011). "Nanoporous Graphitic-C 3 N 4 @Carbon Metal-Free Electrocatalysts for Highly Efficient Oxygen Reduction". Journal of the American Chemical Society. 133 (50): 20116–20119. doi:10.1021/ja209206c. ISSN 0002-7863. PMID 22082332.
