= Pavana =

Pavana may refer to:

- Lycaena pavana, a small butterfly
- Nacaduba pavana, a species of lycaenid butterfly
- Pavana (music), a Renaissance dance
- Pavana (Hinduism), Hindu deity representing the wind
- Pavana, Italy
- Pavana River, a river in Pune, Maharashtra, India

== See also ==
- Pavan (disambiguation)
- Pavane (disambiguation)
- Vayu (disambiguation), another name of the Hindu deity
