= Bayou (disambiguation) =

A bayou is a slow-moving stream or a wetland.

Bayou may also refer to:

== People ==
- Amal Bayou (c. 1957–2017), Libyan microbiologist and politician

== Arts, entertainment, and media ==
=== Music ===
- Bayou Records, a music recording label
- Bayou Country (album), an album by Creedence Clearwater Revival
- "Blue Bayou", a song written by Roy Orbison and Joe Melson
- "Born on the Bayou", a song by Creedence Clearwater Revival from the album Bayou Country

=== Other uses in arts, entertainment and media ===
- Bayou (ballet), a 1952 ballet by George Balanchine
- Bayou (film), a 1957 motion picture directed by Harold Daniels
- Bayou (magazine), an American literary magazine
- Bayou Arcana, a 2012 comic anthology
- The Adventures of Bayou Billy, a 1989 video game by Konami
- Bayou Country (Disneyland), formerly Critter Country, a themed land in Disneyland Park

== Other uses ==
- Bayou (horse), (1954–1982), an American Thoroughbred racemare
- Bayou Hedge Fund Group, a fraudulent investment scheme
- The Bayou, a music venue and nightclub in Washington, D.C.

== See also ==
- Bayu (disambiguation)
