= La Danserye (Susato) =

Renaissance collection of 60 popular dances

La Danserye (or Het derde musyck boexken) (transl. Third music book) is a collection of 60 popular dances written for four instrumentalists composed by Flemish Renaissance composer Tielman Susato while living in Antwerp in 1551. Susato focused on capturing folk melodies, combining them with dances to create his settings. The collection was published using his own publishing company with the original title being "Het derde musyck boexken" (The Third Music Book) in Dutch. There is no original score and instead part books exist which modern settings use as inspiration.

== List ==
Below is an incomplete list of the dances contained within the collection.

1. Dance No. 1
2. Dance No. 2
3. Dance No. 3
4. Dance No. 4
5. Dance No. 5
6. Dance No. 6
7. Dance No. 7
8. Dance No. 8
9. Dance No. 9
10. Dance No. 10
11. Dance No. 11
12. Dance No. 12
13. Dance No. 13
14. Ronde No. 1
15. Ronde No. 2
16. Ronde No. 3
17. Ronde No. 4
18. Ronde No. 5
19. Ronde No. 6
20. Don't vientcela
21. Vostre gent corps
22. Loing de tes jeulx
23. La rosee du mois de may
24. Sans avoir aultre
25. Trop a regretz
26. Je my leuay par ung matin
27. Damours me plains
28. Situte plains
29. Pis ne me peult venir
30. Ioyeulx recueil
31. Sans la veoir cotent estre
32. Le content est riche
33. Plaisir vay plus
34. Cuidez vous que dieu nous
35. Ungiour viendra
36. Mille regretz
37. Craite & Espoir moppressent
38. Qui belles amours a
39. Accordez moy
40. Dargent me plains
41. Languir me fais en douleur
42. Le bergier & la bergiere
43. Tous mes amis
44. Si par souffrir
45. Puis quen januier
46. The Battle Pavane

== See also ==
- Renaissance music
