= Australia Bioinformatics Resource =

- Abbreviation: EMBL-ABR
- Formation: 2011
- Location: Carlton, Melbourne, Australia
- Director: Andrew Lonie
- Deputy Director: Vicky Schneider
- Parent organization: European Molecular Biology Laboratory
- Website: www.embl-abr.org.au
- Formerly called: Bioinformatics Resource Australia - EMBL (BRAEMBL)

The Australia Bioinformatics Resource (EMBL-ABR) (formerly the Bioinformatics Resource Australia - EMBL (BRAEMBL)) was a significant initiative under the associate membership to EMBL.

Since 2019, all activities carried out under EMBL-ABR have rolled over into the Bioplatforms Australia (NCRIS-funded) Australian BioCommons, under new funding agreements and led by Associate Professor Andrew Lonie.

EMBL-ABR aimed to:

1. Increase Australia’s capacity to collect, integrate, analyse, exploit, share and archive the large heterogeneous data sets now part of modern life sciences research
2. Contribute to the development of and provide training in data, tools and platforms to enable Australia’s life science researchers to undertake research in the age of big data
3. Showcase Australian research and datasets at an international level
4. Enable engagement in international programs that create, deploy and develop best practice approaches to data management, software tools and methods, computational platforms and bioinformatics services

EMBL-ABR was supported by Bioplatforms Australia and the University of Melbourne. EMBL-ABR Hub was hosted at the Victorian Life Sciences Computation Initiative (VLSCI) at the University of Melbourne.

In July 2016, EMBL-ABR announced an agreement to collaborate with GOBLET to develop training programs for bioinformatics.
