= Bayu, California =

Human settlement in United States of America

Bayu is a former Maidu settlement in Butte County, California, United States. It was located near Powers on the Feather River.
