= Pavan (surname) =

Pavan is a surname. Notable people with this surname include:

- Andrea Pavan (born 1989), Italian golfer
- Carla Pavan (born 1975), Canadian skeleton racer
- Crodowaldo Pavan (1919–2009), Brazilian biologist and geneticist
- Marisa Pavan (1932–2023), Italian-born actress
- Rebecca Pavan (born 1990), Canadian volleyball player
- Sarah Pavan (born 1986), Canadian beach volleyball player
- Simone Pavan (born 1974), Italian footballer

== See also ==
- Pavan (given name)
