= Pavan, Dahanu =

Village in Maharashtra

Pavan
- village
- Location in Maharashtra, India Pavan (India)
- Coordinates: 19.9557908°N 72.9844401°E
- Country: India
- State: Maharashtra
- District: Palghar
- Taluka: Dahanu
- Elevation: 81 m (266 ft)

Population (2011)
  - Total: 1,450
- Time zone: UTC+5:30 (IST)
- 2011 census code: 551667

Pavan is a village in the Palghar district of Maharashtra, India. It is located in the Dahanu taluka.

== Demographics ==
According to the 2011 census of India, Pavan has 251 households. The effective literacy rate (i.e. the literacy rate of population excluding children aged 6 and below) is 30.22%.

Demographics (2011 Census)
	Total	Male	Female
Population	1450	695	755
Children aged below 6 years	252	119	133
Scheduled caste	0	0	0
Scheduled tribe	1433	685	748
Literates	362	227	135
Workers (all)	427	241	186
Main workers (total)	218	106	112
Main workers: Cultivators	95	46	49
Main workers: Agricultural labourers	27	11	16
Main workers: Household industry workers	2	1	1
Main workers: Other	94	48	46
Marginal workers (total)	209	135	74
Marginal workers: Cultivators	104	89	15
Marginal workers: Agricultural labourers	61	19	42
Marginal workers: Household industry workers	11	5	6
Marginal workers: Others	33	22	11
Non-workers	1023	454	569
