= Pavan Ramdya =

US-American neuroscientist

Professor Pavan Ramdya
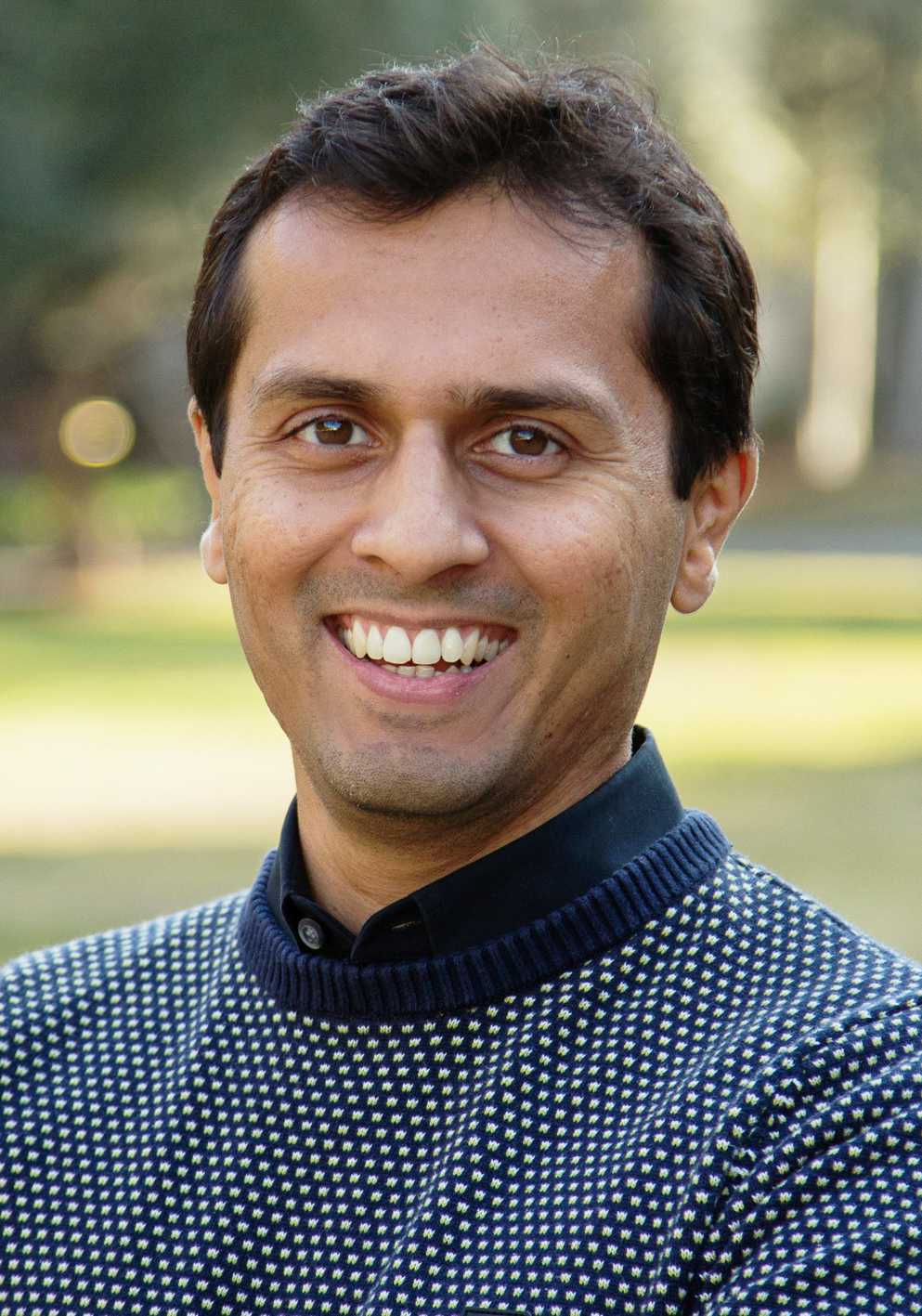
- Pavan Ramdya in 2016
- Born: 1979 (age 46–47); New York City
- Citizenship: United States; Switzerland

Academic background
- Education: Neuroscience
- Alma mater: Drew University; Harvard University
- Doctoral advisor: Florian Engert
- Other advisors: Richard Benton; Dario Floreano; Michael Dickinson

Academic work
- Discipline: Neuroscience
- Sub-discipline: Neuroengineering
- Institutions: École Polytechnique Fédérale de Lausanne (EPFL)
- Main interests: Neuroscience; Neuroengineering; Robotics; Synthetic neurobiology
- Website: https://www.epfl.ch/labs/ramdya-lab/

Pavan Ramdya (born 1979) is an American and Swiss neuroscientist and bioengineer. His research centers on understanding the cognitive and neuromechanical control of behavior toward applications in robotics and artificial intelligence. He holds the Firmenich Next Generation Chair in neuroscience and bioengineering at EPFL (École Polytechnique Fédérale de Lausanne), and is head of the Neuroengineering Laboratory at EPFL's School of Life Sciences.

== Career ==
Ramdya studied neuroscience at Drew University, where he received his bachelor's degree with honors (summa cum laude, Phi Beta Kappa) in 2001. He continued his studies at Harvard University and in 2009 received a PhD for his work in the group of Florian Engert. He then went on to perform postdoctoral work in neurogenetics and robotics in the laboratories of Richard Benton at University of Lausanne (UNIL) and Dario Floreano at EPFL, respectively. There he studied locomotor control and collective behavior in Drosophila melanogaster. In 2015, he moved to the California Institute of Technology to work as a visiting postdoctoral fellow with Michael Dickinson where he developed a means for imaging motor circuit activity in behaving Drosophila.

Since 2017 he has been a professor of neuroscience and bioengineering at EPFL, and head of the Neuroengineering Laboratory located in both the Brain Mind Institute and at the Institute of Bioengineering in EPFL's School of Life Sciences.

== Research ==
Ramdya's research is focused on reverse-engineering biological neuromechanical control to inspire the development of artificial systems that can mimic the flexibility and agility of animal behaviors. Specifically, he studies limb-dependent behaviors in the adult fly, Drosophila melanogaster, employing an interdisciplinary approach which draws on genetic manipulations, neural and behavioral recordings, physics simulations and artificial neural networks.

His research has been featured in National Geographic, IEEE Spectrum, Nature, Quanta Magazine, and Le Monde.

== Distinctions ==
He is a member of the FENS-Kavli Network of Excellence. He has been the recipient of HFSP Long-term and Career Development Awards, as well as the UNIL Biology and Medicine, Young Investigator Award in Basic Science. In 2019, he was awarded an SNSF Eccellenza Grant.

== Selected works ==
- Chen, Chin-Lin; Hermans, Laura; Viswanathan, Meera C.; Fortun, Denis; Aymanns, Florian; Unser, Michael; Cammarato, Anthony; Dickinson, Michael H.; Ramdya, Pavan (2018). "Imaging neural activity in the ventral nerve cord of behaving adult Drosophila". Nature Communications. 9 (1): 4390. Bibcode:2018NatCo...9.4390C. doi:10.1038/s41467-018-06857-z. PMC 6197219. PMID 30348941. S2CID 27866747.
- Günel, Semih; Rhodin, Helge; Morales, Daniel; Campagnolo, João; Ramdya, Pavan; Fua, Pascal (2019). "DeepFly3D, a deep learning-based approach for 3D limb and appendage tracking in tethered, adult Drosophila". eLife. 8 e48571. doi:10.7554/eLife.48571. PMC 6828327. PMID 31584428.
- Ramdya, Pavan; Thandiackal, Robin; Cherney, Raphael; Asselborn, Thibault; Benton, Richard; Ijspeert, Auke Jan; Floreano, Dario (2017). "Climbing favours the tripod gait over alternative faster insect gaits". Nature Communications. 8 14494. Bibcode:2017NatCo...814494R. doi:10.1038/ncomms14494. PMC 5321742. PMID 28211509. S2CID 2108620.
- Ramdya, Pavan; Lichocki, Pawel; Cruchet, Steeve; Frisch, Lukas; Tse, Winnie; Floreano, Dario; Benton, Richard (2015). "Mechanosensory interactions drive collective behaviour in Drosophila" (PDF). Nature. 519 (7542): 233–236. Bibcode:2015Natur.519..233R. doi:10.1038/nature14024. PMC 4359906. PMID 25533959. S2CID 2463744.
- Ramdya, Pavan; Benton, Richard (2010). "Evolving olfactory systems on the fly". Trends in Genetics. 26 (7): 307–316. doi:10.1016/j.tig.2010.04.004. PMID 20537755.
- Ramdya, Pavan; Engert, Florian (2008). "Emergence of binocular functional properties in a monocular neural circuit". Nature Neuroscience. 11 (9): 1083–1090. doi:10.1038/nn.2166. PMC 2958220. PMID 19160507.
