= Cinta yang tak Sederhana =

- Genre: Drama; Romance
- Screenplay by: Gajra Kottary; Serena Luna
- Story by: Gajra Kottary; Serena Luna
- Directed by: Sai
- Creative director: Sharad Sharaan
- Starring: Dannia Salsabilla; Erdin Werdrayana; Ise Irish; Jeremie Moeremans; Dina Lorenza; Adam Jordan; Windy Wulandari; Minati Atmanagara; Pierre Gruno; Reynold Surbakti; Bara Valentino; Hikmal Abrar; Tri A. Ningtyas; Aditya Herpavi; Ena Pasaribu
- Theme music composer: Ade Govinda
- Opening theme: "Masih Belum Lupa" — Ade Govinda feat Anneth
- Ending theme: "Masih Belum Lupa" — Ade Govinda feat Anneth
- Composer: Bella
- Country of origin: Indonesia
- Original language: Indonesian
- No. of seasons: 1
- No. of episodes: 63

Production
- Executive producer: David S. Suwarto
- Producer: Lili Wong
- Cinematography: Riano Indra Kusuma
- Editors: Mustadi; Fangky Yushatta; Rully K.P.; Sirojudin
- Camera setup: Multi-camera
- Running time: 30—35 minutes
- Production company: SinemArt

Original release
- Network: Indosiar
- Release: 20 March – 21 May 2023

Cinta yang Tak Sederhana (transl. A Love That Is Not Simple) is an Indonesian soap opera produced by SinemArt which premiered 20 March 2023 on Indosiar. Directed by Sai and starred by Dannia Salsabilla, Erdin Werdrayana, and Ise Irish.

== Plot ==
Raja, a handsome man and the grandson of a successful businessman. Raja loved Indah, simple charming beautiful girl. However, because of his grandfather's request, Raja is forced to marry Nasya, the daughter of a business partner. On the other hand, there is Adi who loves Nasya, but can only keep his feelings of love.

== Cast ==
- Dannia Salsabilla as Indah Putri Mega
- Erdin Werdrayana as Raja Dirgantara
- Ise Irish as Nasya Anindita
- Jeremie Moeremans as Adi Pramundito
- Dina Lorenza as Mega
- Adam Jordan as Bobby
- Windy Wulandari as Maya
- Minati Atmanagara as Zahra
- Pierre Gruno as Prabu Syahputra
- Reynold Surbakti as Mahdi Alamsyah
- Bara Valentino as Surya
- Hikmal Abrar as Satrio
- Tri A. Ningtyas as Ria Agustin
- Aditya Herpavi as Abas Syahputra
- Ena Pasaribu as Liza
- Alejandro Mariano as Bayu
- Ika Purpitasar as Marni
- Udin Sedunia as Udin
- Fendy Pradana as Joko Purnomo
- Panglima Bintang Agara as Emon
- Djihan Ranti as Sinta
- Putri Farin as Marshanda
