= Victorian Partnership for Advanced Computing =

VPAC
- Type: Not For Profit
- Industry: Information and Communications Technology Eresearch
- Founded: 2000
- Headquarters: Melbourne, Australia

The Victorian Partnership for Advanced Computing (VPAC) was a leading, independent advanced computing R&D service provider and not-for-profit research agency established in 2000 by a consortium of Victorian universities: Deakin University, La Trobe University, Monash University, RMIT University, Swinburne University of Technology, The University of Melbourne, University of Ballarat, Victoria University.

VPAC provided expert services, training and support in high-performance computing as well as professional research and development services in the application of advanced computing in the fields of engineering, geospatial, health, life sciences, astrophysical research and grid computing to over 800 researchers from universities and research institutes across Victoria, as well as its sister organisation in other states. VPAC specialists also provided HPC support to multinational vendors and their customers across Australia.

VPAC worked together with the Victorian eResearch Strategic Initiative to promote the uptake of advanced computing in Australian scientific research and development, and the two organisations merged to form the V3 Alliance in 2013. V3 HPC operations, HPC support, and academic advanced computing initiatives were rolled into the Victorian universities and ceased operation as an independent entity in December 2015.

VPAC's engineering arm worked with many major Australian and multinational companies in the optimisation and refinement of products through the use of HPC, and that group continues business as VPAC-Innovations.

In 2011, it was announced that VPAC, Monash University and Australian Synchrotron had chosen an IBM iDataPlex dx360 M3 for the Multi-modal Australian Sciences Imaging and Visualisation Environment (MASSIVE) facility.

== Mission statement ==
VPACs mission was to promote the use of Advanced Computing amongst Australian researchers. VPAC operated a state of the art, internationally recognised Supercomputing Facility featuring High Performance Computing Clusters and Software, Advanced Visualisation and Collaboration Tools and Grid Resources, as well as provided consulting services and expertise for applications.
