= Unincorporated entity =

An unincorporated entity is an organisation that has not been granted formal corporate status by incorporation.

== Description ==
The most common and traditional unincorporated entities are sole traders, partnerships, and trustees of trusts. Modern unincorporated entities include limited partnerships (but not incorporated limited partnerships), limited liability partnerships (but not UK Limited Liability Partnerships, which are corporations), Limited liability limited partnerships, and limited liability companies.

Unincorporated societies and clubs are also unincorporated entities.

An unincorporated entity will generally be a separate entity for accounting purposes, but may or may not be a separate legal entity. For example, partnerships in England and Scotland are separate entities for accounting purposes, but while English partnerships are not separate legal entities, in Scotland they are separate legal persons. (but are not regarded as corporations).

== Australia ==
In Australian law, incorporation occurs under the Corporations Act 2001, and includes:

- a branch of an overseas company not incorporated in Australia (often the name ends in corporation)
- incorporated associations which are incorporated under an Act of one of the States and territories of Australia, and
- incorporated charitable institutions.
- people grouped together by a common purpose with club-like characteristics, for example, a sporting club, social club or trade union.
- It does not include joint ventures.

== India ==
In Indian law, an unincorporated company means any partnership firm whether registered or not under Indian Partnership Act, 1932, whose number of partners exceed 20 and exceed 10 in case of a banking business. Such unincorporated company is also known as an illegal association. It does not include an HUF.
