= Pavan Duggal =

Indian lawyer

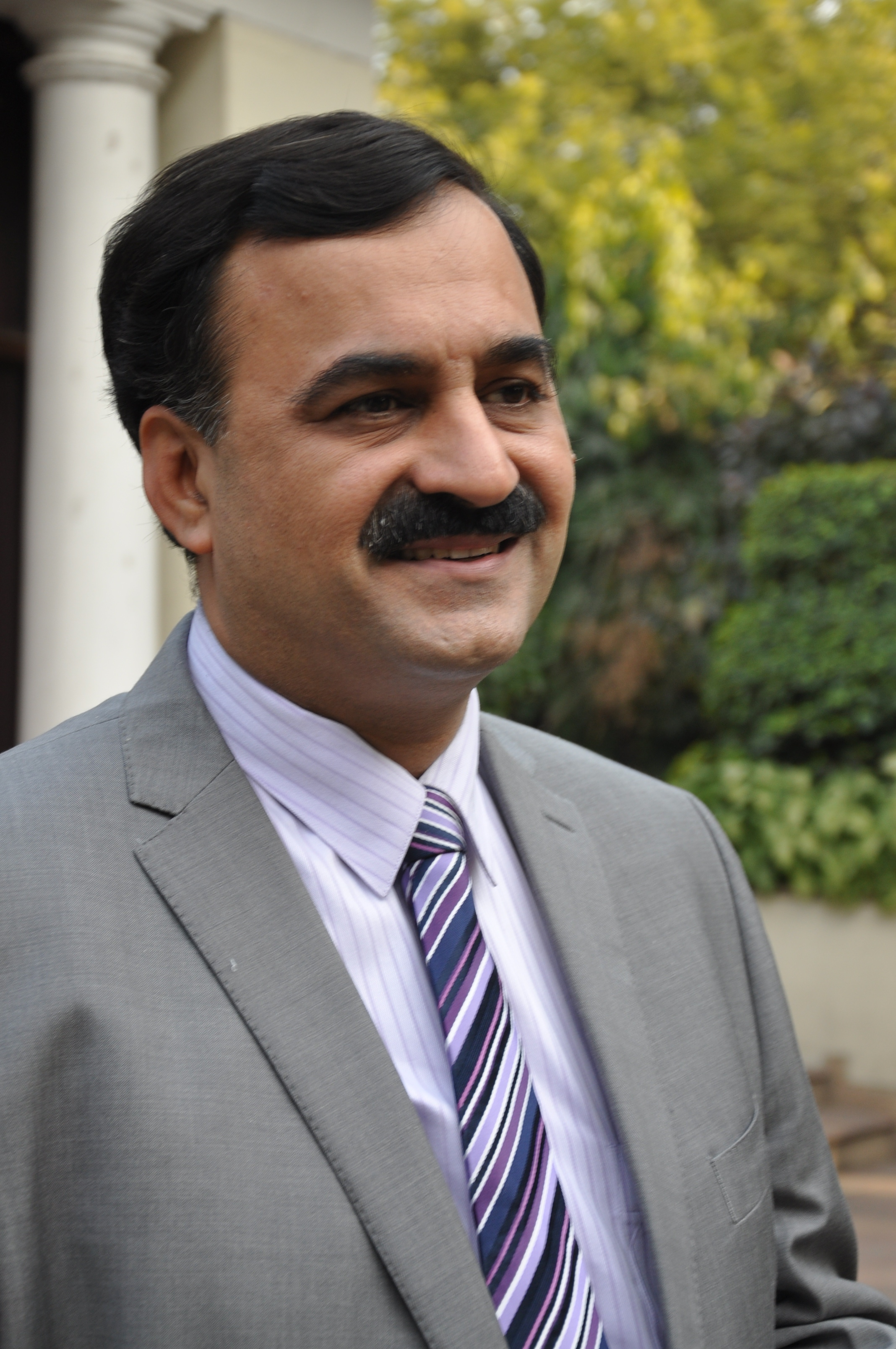
Pavan Duggal

Pavan Duggal is an advocate practising in the Supreme Court of India, specialized in the field of Cyberlaw, Cybercrime Law, Cybersecurity Law, and Artificial Intelligence Law. He is a member of NomCom Committee on Multilingual Internet Names Consortium (MINC).

He is the President of Cyberlaws.Net. He has worked in mobile law, convergence law and dark net law. He is the president of Cyberlaw Asia.

Duggal is the Conference Director of the International Conference on Cyberlaw, Cybercrime & Cybersecurity organized by Cyberlaws.Net.

Duggal is the Chairman of the International Commission on Cyber Security Law.

== Committees ==
He has been a member of a number of committees:

- Member of the Permanent Monitoring Panel on "The Future of Cyber Security" of the World Federation of Scientists, an organization active in the framework of ICSC – International Centre for Scientific Culture - World Laboratory.
- Permanent Monitoring Panel (PMP) on Information Security, established by World Federation of Scientists
- The ICANN Nominating Committee representing the Asia Pacific region, 2003 and 2004.
- Membership Advisory Committee of The Internet Corporation for Assigned Names and Numbers (ICANN).
- Advisory Council of the Institute of Cyber Security and Law of University of Delhi
- Chairman, Confederation of Indian Industry Delhi Panel on Cyber Security

Duggal has been contributing to the evolving legal jurisprudence on Artificial Intelligence, through his books on artificial intelligence and also through his course on Artificial Intelligence legalities.

He has contributed to academic discussions and debate evolving Artificial Intelligence jurisprudence. He has broadly highlighted the importance of Artificial Intelligence in the context of judicial systems. He commented:

With Artificial Intelligence (AI), block chain and Internet of Things (IoT) changing the world around, the judiciary is bound to evolve dramatically by 2030. And so will be the demand of service from lawyers. With all the information and technological support at hand, the client will already have the data analysis and insights. They would require lawyers to guide them through it and provide necessary support. Hence the future lawyers need to be super lawyers who will be analyst, broadcaster and lawyer, all rolled into one.

== Role in Evolving Metaverse Law ==
Duggal is the Chief Evangelist of Metaverse Law Nucleus.

== Books and recognition ==
He has written several books/eBooks on various diverse and complex aspects concerning the legalities of policy-related issues impacting cyberspace, Internet and the World Wide Web. He has authored India's first mobile law treatise, which focuses on litigation and jurisprudence vis-à-vis mobile communication devices.

As per the International Telecommunications Union, as a Writer, he has made his mark with 179 Books on various aspects of the law in the last 20 years. Dr. Pavan Duggal’s books have been conferred various awards by Book Authority in various categories over a couple of years.

He has authored 179 books on the intersection of law and technology over the last two and a half decades. The vast and diverse range of Pavan Duggal’s books include Books on Cyber Law, Cybercrime Law, Cyber Security Law, Artificial Intelligence Law, Blockchain Law, Internet of Things Law, Other Emerging Technologies and Legalities and on Coronavirus & Cyber Legal Issues.

The World Summit on the Information Society gives details of numerous books authored by Dr. Pavan Duggal on the website of the International Telecommunications Union.

Pavan Duggal’s numerous books have been recognized by Book Authority through numerous awards that have been conferred on Duggal’s Books.
