= Melbourne Bioinformatics =

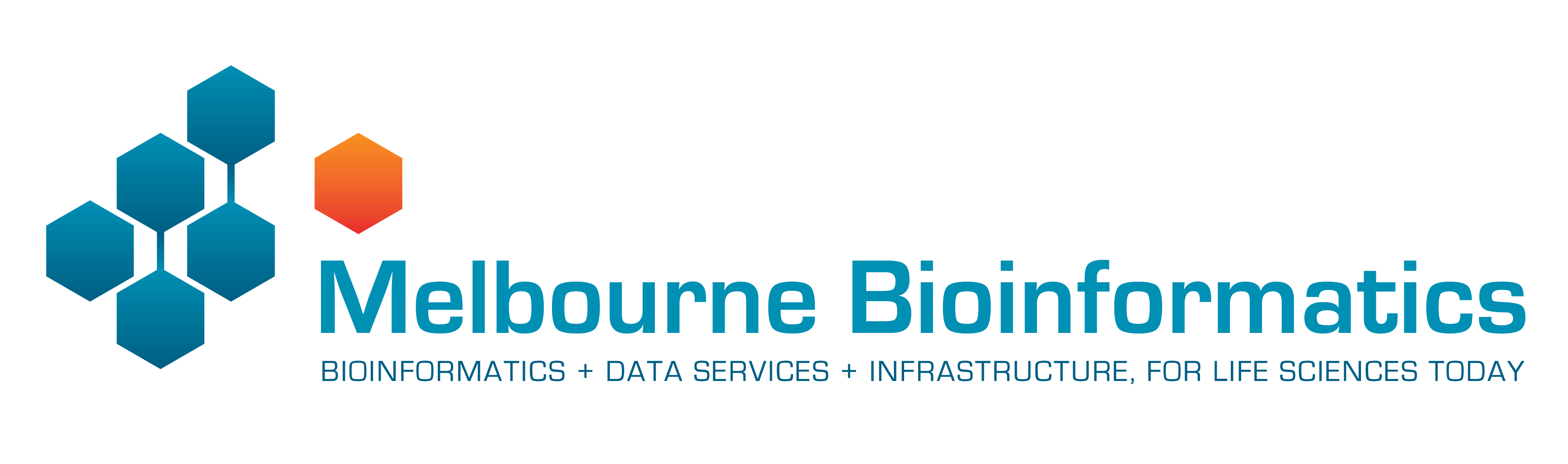
- Former names: Victorian Life Sciences Computation Initiative (VLSCI)
- Established: 2008
- Affiliations: The University of Melbourne
- Location: The University of Melbourne; Level 1, 21 Bedford St. North Melbourne, Victoria, Australia
- Website: mdhs.unimelb.edu.au/melbournebioinformatics

Melbourne Bioinformatics (formerly the Victorian Life Sciences Computation Initiative, VLSCI) is a centre for computational life science expertise. It provides bioinformatics support for all researchers and students in a wide range of projects and services of local and national significance. Researchers can engage with Melbourne Bioinformatics through training and consulting with experts which can lead to project collaborations with academic staff within the University of Melbourne.

== History ==
The VLSCI was established as part of the Victorian government's plans to support biotechnology, and was listed as a key infrastructure project in the Victorian Biotechnology Action Plan 2011. It was a $100m initiative of the Victorian Government in partnership with The University of Melbourne and the IBM Life Sciences Research Collaboratory, Melbourne. Other major stakeholders included key Victorian health and medical research institutions, major universities and public research organisations.

In 2015 the VLSCI transitioned to a new governance model after receiving a further $6.65m from the Victorian State Government. The first IBM Research Collaboratory for Life Sciences was co-located at VLSCI for 5 years. Since moving to the nearby offices of IBM Research Australia, Collaboratory staff have continued to work on a range of projects as part of a broader University of Melbourne/IBM partnership under the new name of Melbourne Bioinformatics.

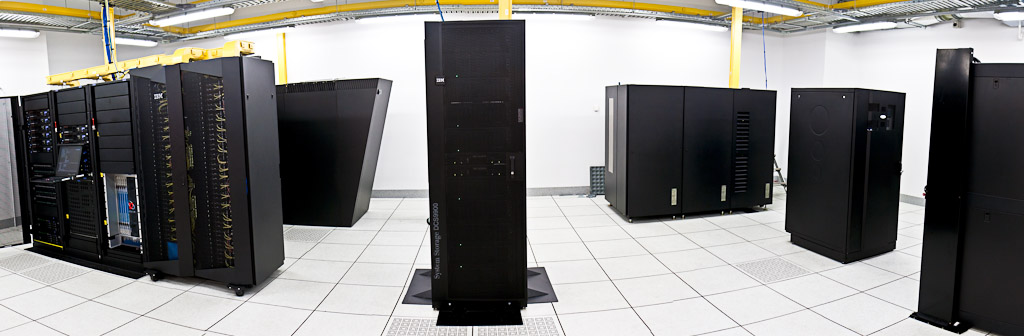

Melbourne Bioinformatics's petascale high performance computation facility was accessible to researchers in Victoria by operating across various universities and research institutes in Melbourne. The clusters were in the top 500 worldwide in 2017. Technical experts were on staff to maximise the user experience, meet the skills gaps in research teams, build the necessary cross-disciplinary research collaborations, and provide skills to scale up projects to efficiently use the processing power being delivered. Ongoing skills development and training was provided in computational biology, molecular modelling and bioinformatics.

=== The Computers ===
At its peak, the VLSCI's Peak Computing Facility operated at 855 teraflops. The systems included 'Barcoo', an IBM iDataPlex x86, 'Merri', an IBM iDataPlex x86 and 'Avoca', comprising 4 racks of IBM Blue Gene/Q.

=== Peak Computing Facility ===
The VLSCI Peak Computing Facility (PCF) provided high-performance compute infrastructure and computational expertise to Life Sciences researchers across Victoria. The PCF had tightly-coupled clusters with very fast disk subsystems, currently operating at a peak capacity of 855 teraflops. To help researchers maximize their use of compute time and get the most out of their allocated resources, the PCF had a team of system administrators, programmers and application specialists accessible through its help request system.

=== Life Sciences Computation Centre ===
The VLSCI Life Science Computation Centre (LSCC) was physically housed at the University of Melbourne and La Trobe University, and with many staff working at various research institutes including The Peter Doherty Institute for Infection and Immunity (Doherty Institute) for some portion of their week. The LSCC was a distributed pool of expertise and infrastructure for computational life science research, servicing life science research institutions across Victoria. It aimed to foster research collaboration and support to a relatively small number of specific external projects; act as a source of common resources, software platforms and expertise to support life science researchers; offer research training, education, and career development for bioinformaticians and computational biologists, to support the advancement of the Victorian computational life sciences research community; and support the advancement of life science computation as a whole in Victoria.

== Galaxy Australia ==
Melbourne Bioinformatics together with QFAB Bioinformatics, QCIF and the University of Queensland’s Research Computing Centre jointly built and operate Galaxy Australia which is a major feature of the Genomics Virtual Laboratory.

== See also ==
- National Computational Infrastructure
