= Western Australian Regional Computing Centre =

Defunct computing centre

Coordinates: 31.978467°S 115.816712°E

Western Australian Regional Computing Centre (WARCC) was part of the University of Western Australia, formed to provide computing services to the university, other universities in Western Australia, government departments, and to some private companies. It specialised in technical and scientific computing. It was formed on 1 January 1972, and ceased in 1991, when parts of it were spun off to become Winthrop Technology.

Among the services it provided were time-shared computer processing, facilities management, software development, microcomputer rental and sales. It was Digital Equipment Corporation's first customer for the PDP-6.

Its first Director was Dennis Moore (1972–1979), followed by Alex Reid (1979–1991).

WARCC's Data Communications group, headed by Terry Gent, developed computer networking hardware and software. Using a combination of equipment from Digital Equipment Corporation and other vendors, and hardware and software that the group developed, it built a campus-wide network and then extended that to link the networks of the universities in Western Australia in the first heterogeneous packet switching network in Australia.

== General references ==
- Falloon, Keith (2001). Cyberhistory (MSc thesis).
- Reid, T. Alex (2009). "Computing". In Gregory, Jenny; Gothard, Janice (eds.). Historical Encyclopedia of Western Australia (PDF). Crawley: UWA Publishing. pp. 223–225. ISBN 978-1-921401-15-2. OCLC 405500003. OL 45266821M. Wikidata Q5773872.
