= The Battle Pavane =

The Battle Pavane (alternative spelling: Battle Pavan) is an instrumental piece by Tielman Susato which he published in 1551 in alderhande Danserye, a collection of Renaissance dance music.

Battle Pavane

As of 2007, Bob Margolis' arrangement of it has gained mass popularity among high school wind ensembles in the USA. The piece is often played by Renaissance-style bands and always features a large trumpet part. The piece begins with a melody based around repeated pitches, with the rhythm half-quarter-quarter in modern notation (minim, crotchet, crotchet). It ends with a fanfare of rapidly repeated sixteenth notes in modern notation (semiquavers). This piece is very typical of the mid-sixteenth century court music and would have been played by consorts of instruments of the same type, like sackbutts and cornetts, shawms, viols, recorders, and possible also by mixed consorts.
