= Swiss National Supercomputing Centre =

Research institute in high-performance computing

Coordinates: 46°1′28.81″N 8°57′36.21″E

Swiss National Supercomputing Centre CSCS
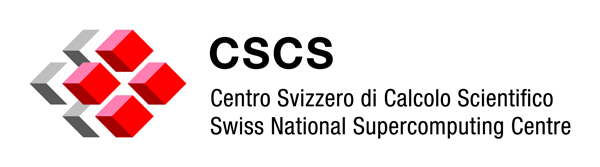
- Established: 1991; 35 years ago
- Budget: 24.3 million CHF
- Director: Thomas Schulthess
- Staff: 120
- Location: Lugano, Ticino, Switzerland
- Operating agency: ETH Zurich
- Website: www.cscs.ch

The Swiss National Supercomputing Centre (Italian: Centro Svizzero di Calcolo Scientifico; CSCS) is the national high-performance computing centre of Switzerland. It was founded in Manno, canton Ticino, in 1991. In March 2012, the CSCS moved to its new location in Lugano-Cornaredo.

The main function of the Swiss National Supercomputing Centre is a so-called National User Lab. It is open to all Swiss researchers and their assistants, who can get free access to CSCS' supercomputers in a competitive scientific evaluation process.

In addition, the centre operates dedicated computing facilities for specific research projects and national mandates, e.g. weather forecasting. It is the national competence centre for high-performance computing and serves as a technology platform for Swiss research in computational science.

CSCS is an autonomous unit of the Swiss Federal Institute of Technology in Zurich (ETH Zurich) and closely collaborates with the local University of Lugano (USI).

== Building ==
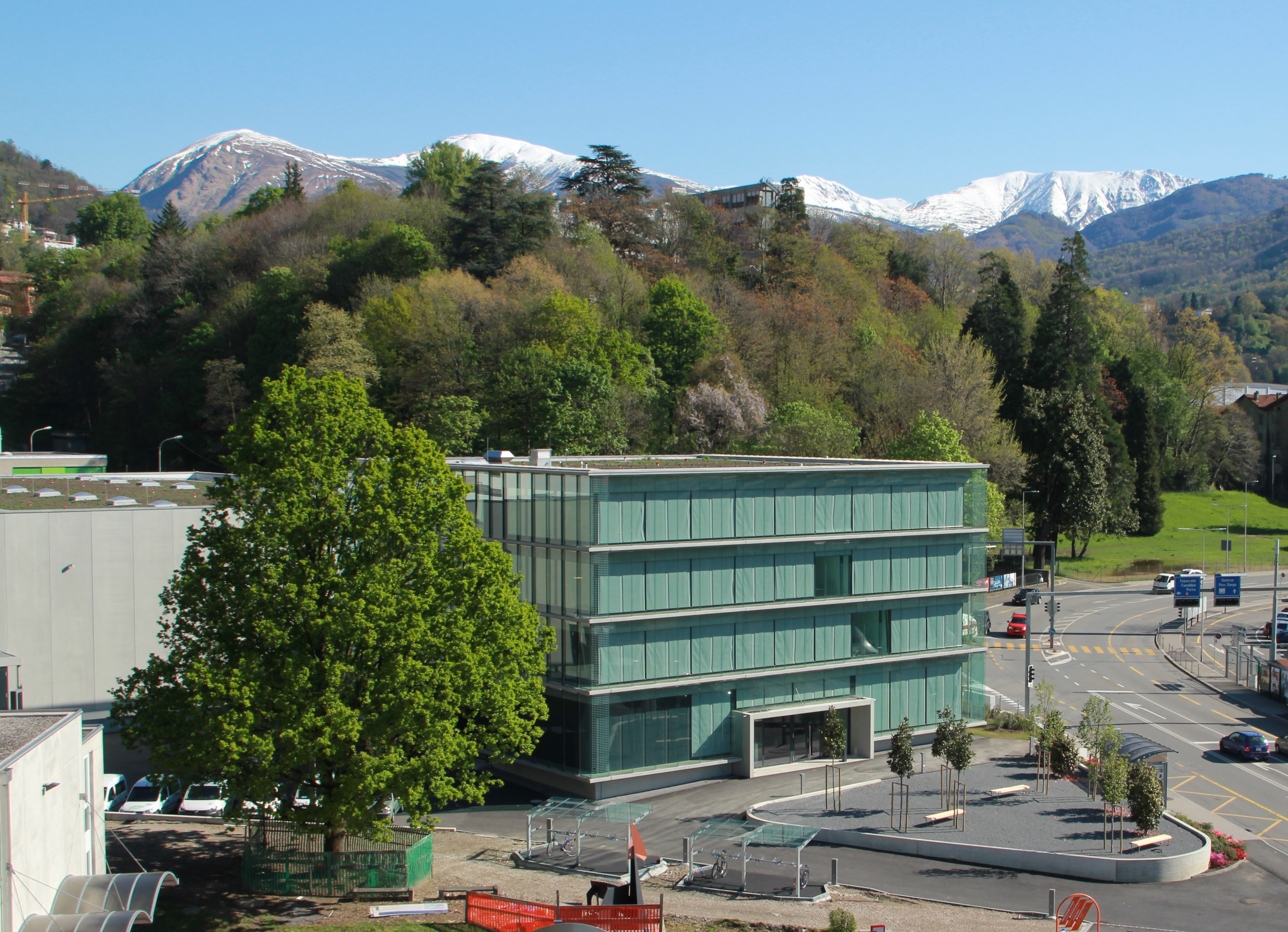
The office building of the Swiss National Supercomputing Centre, with part of the computing building on the left edge of the photo.

The building at the new location Lugano-Cornaredo has a pillar-free machine hall of 2,000 m^{2} and can be powered with up to 27 MW electricity. Water for cooling the supercomputers is taken from Lake Lugano in 45m depth and pumped over a distance of 2.8 km to the centre. Thus, little energy is consumed for providing the cooling and the computer centre achieves a high energy efficiency with a PUE < 1.25.

== Supercomputers ==
Supercomputer procurements at CSCS can be categorised into two phases: In the first phase from 1991 to 2011, the centre focused on proven technologies in order to facilitate user access to its services. This strategy was centred on the SX vector processor architecture of NEC. The IBM SP4, installed 2002, was the first production system of CSCS with a massively-parallel computer architecture. The procurement of the first Cray XT3 in Europe in 2005 marked the beginning of the second phase. Since then, CSCS concentrates on early technologies, preferably before they become a generally available product.

The names of CSCS's computing facilities, as can be seen below, are usually adopted from mountains in the Swiss Alps.

=== Current computing facilities ===
Name	Model	Processor type	No. of processors	Start of operation (last upgrade)	Peak performance (FLOPS)	Use
Alps	HPE Cray EX254n	NVIDIA Grace 72C 3.1GHz, NVIDIA GH200 Superchip	2,121,600 cores	2025	434.90 petaflops	High Performance Computing, Machine Learning/Artificial Intelligence, Weather & Climates
Piz Daint	Hybrid Cray XC40/XC50	Intel Haswell-EP + Nvidia Tesla P100 GPUs	206,720 cores	2017	29.347 petaflops	Research (computer simulations)
Arolla and Tsa	Cray CS-Storm	Intel Xeon Gold 6134 + Nvidia Tesla V100 GPUs				Numerical weather prediction (MeteoSwiss)
Mönch	NEC cluster					
Monte Leone	HP DL 360 Gen 9					
Phoenix	Computer cluster (various manufacturers)	Intel Sandy Bridge 2.6 GHz and AMD Opteron 16-core Interlagos 2.1 GHz	82 (736 cores)	October 2007 (May 2012)	13.32 teraflops	Computing grid of the CERN LHC

=== Previous computing facilities ===
Name	Model	Processor type	No. of processors	Period of operation	Peak performance (TFLOPS)	Use
Kesch and Es-cha	Cray CS-Storm	Intel Haswell-EP + Nvidia Tesla K80 GPUs		2015–2020		Numerical weather prediction (MeteoSwiss)
Piz Daint	Hybrid Cray XC30	Intel Sandy Bridge 2.6 GHz + NVIDIA Tesla K20X GPUs	5,272 (42,176 cores; 84,352 hardware threads + 1 GPU x node)	November 2013	7,787	Research (computer simulations)
Blue Brain 4	IBM Blue Gene/Q	Power BQC 16C 1.6 GHz	65,536 cores	2013–2018	838.9	Blue Brain Project
Piz Daint	Cray XC30	Intel Sandy Bridge 2.6 GHz	4,512 (36,096 cores; 72,192 hardware threads)	December 2012	750.7	Research (computer simulations)
Monte Lema	Cray XE6	AMD Opteron 12-core Magny-Cours 2.1 GHz	336 (4,032 cores)	April 2012	33.87	Numerical weather prediction (MeteoSwiss)
Albis	Cray XE6	AMD Opteron 12-core Magny-Cours 2.1 GHz	144 (1,728 cores)	April 2012	14.52	Numerical weather prediction (MeteoSwiss)
Tödi	Cray XK7	AMD Opteron 16-core Interlagos 2.1 GHz and Nvidia Tesla K20x GPU	272 (4,352 cores) + 272 GPUs	October 2011 (October 2012)	393.00	Research (computer simulations)
Matterhorn	Cray XMT Next Generation	Cray Threadstorm	64 (8,192 hardware threads)	June 2011	n/a	Research (in particular analysis of unstructured data)
Monte Rosa	Cray XE6	AMD Opteron 16-core Interlagos 2.1 GHz	2,992 (47,872 cores)	May 2009 (November 2011)	402.12	Research (computer simulations)
La Dôle	Cray XT4	AMD Opteron quad-core Barcelona 2.3 GHz	160 (640 cores)	May 2007–June 2012	5.88	Numerical weather prediction (MeteoSwiss)
Piz Buin	Cray XT4	AMD Opteron quad-core Barcelona 2.3 GHz	264 (1,056 cores)	May 2007–June 2012	9.71	Numerical weather prediction (MeteoSwiss)
Mont Blanc	IBM System p575	IBM POWER5, 1.5 GHz	768	October 2006–January 2010	4.6	Research (computer simulations)
Piz Palü	Cray XT3	AMD Opteron dual-core 2.6 GHz	1,664 (3,328 cores)	June 2005–April 2009	17.31	Research (computer simulations)
Venus	IBM System p690	IBM POWER4, 1.3 GHz	256	2002–2006	1.33	Research (computer simulations)
Prometeo	NEC SX-5	NEC SX-5 vector processor	16	1999–2007	0.128	Research (computer simulations) and numerical weather prediction (MeteoSwiss)
Gottardo	NEC SX-4	NEC SX-4 vector processor	16	1995–2004	0.032	Research (computer simulations)
Adula	NEC SX-3	NEC SX-3 vector processor	2	1992–1995	0.0128	Research (computer simulations)

== National Supercomputing Service ==
Run as a user lab, CSCS promotes and encourages top-notch research. Simulations created on supercomputers yield completely new insights in science. Consequently, CSCS operates cutting-edge computer systems as an essential service facility for Swiss researchers. These computers aid scientists with diverse issues and requirements - from the pure calculation of complex problems to analysis of complex data. The pool of national high-performance computers is available to its users as a so-called user lab: all researchers in and out of Switzerland can use the supercomputer infrastructure.

== Dedicated HPC Services ==
In addition to the computers of the User Lab, CSCS operates dedicated compute resources for strategic research projects and tasks of national interest. Since 2001, the calculations for the numerical weather prediction of the Swiss meteorological survey MeteoSwiss take place at the Swiss National Supercomputing Centre. In January 2008, the first operational high-resolution weather forecasting suite in Europe was taken in production on a massively-parallel supercomputer at CSCS. Another dedicated computer resource operated by CSCS is the Swiss tier-2 computer cluster for the Computing Grid of the CERN LHC accelerator.

CSCS also provides storage services for massive data sets of the Swiss systems biology initiative SystemsX and the Centre for Climate Systems Modelling C2SM at ETH Zurich.

== Research and development ==
For supporting the further development of its supercomputing services, CSCS regularly evaluates relevant new technologies (technology scouting) and publishes the results as white papers on its website.

In 2009, CSCS and the University of Lugano jointly launched the platform HP2C with the goal to prepare the application codes of Swiss researchers for upcoming supercomputer architectures.

In September 2025, researchers from EPFL, ETH Zurich, and the Swiss National Supercomputing Centre launched Apertus, a fully open-source, multilingual large language model.

== See also ==
- Science and technology in Switzerland
- Supercomputing in Europe
- TOP500
