= Piz Daint (supercomputer) =

Supercomputer in Switzerland

- Active: 2012–present (upgraded November 2016)
- Location: Swiss National Supercomputing Centre
- Architecture: Intel Xeon E5-26xx (various), Nvidia Tesla P100
- Power: 2.272 MW
- Operating system: Linux (CLE)
- Storage: 8.7 PB
- Speed: 25.326 PFLOPS (LINPACK)
- Ranking: TOP500: 20th, as of November 2021
- Website: www.cscs.ch/computers/piz-daint/

Piz Daint is a supercomputer in the Swiss National Supercomputing Centre, named after the mountain Piz Daint in the Swiss Alps.

It was ranked 8th on the TOP500 ranking of supercomputers until the end of 2015, higher than any other supercomputer in Europe. At the end of 2016, the computing performance of Piz Daint was tripled to reach 25 petaflops; it thus became the third most powerful supercomputer in the world. As of November 2021, Piz Daint is ranked 20th on the TOP500.

== History ==
The original Piz Daint Cray XC30 system was installed in December 2012. This system was extended with Piz Dora, a Cray XC40 with 1,256 compute nodes, in 2013. In October 2016, Piz Daint and Piz Dora were upgraded and combined into the current Cray XC50/XC40 system featuring Nvidia Tesla P100 GPUs.
