= Cray XC50 =

Supercomputer manufactured by Cray

The Cray XC50 is a massively parallel multiprocessor supercomputer manufactured by Cray. The machine can support Intel Xeon processors, as well as Cavium ThunderX2 processors, Xeon Phi processors and NVIDIA Tesla P100 GPUs. The processors are connected by Cray's proprietary "Aries" interconnect, in a dragonfly network topology. The XC50 is an evolution of the XC40, with the main difference being the support of Tesla P100 processors and the use of Cray software release CLE 6 or 7.

== Deployed Cray XC50 systems ==
=== Australia ===
- Bureau of Meteorology deployed a combined XC50 and CS500 platform.

=== India ===
- Indian Institute of Technology, Bombay (IITB) has deployed a Cray XC50 system named Spacetime with a peak performance of 1 petaflops coupled with Cray ClusterStor L300 Lustre storage system.

=== Japan ===
- The Japanese National Institutes for Quantum and Radiological Science and Technology has deployed on 2018 26th July a XC50 to support the ITER fusion project. At deployment, it will not be as fast as the Swiss Piz Daint computer; however, it is predicted as one of the top 30 supercomputers in the world, and the fastest available to fusion researchers.
- The Japan Meteorological Agency is planning to deploy 2 Cray XC50s to help with weather forecasting. The systems will be deployed with the assistance of Cray and Hitachi.
- The Center for Computational Astrophysics at the National Astronomical Observatory of Japan have deployed a XC50 named ATERUI II, named after a Japanese chief. It has 40,200 Xeon cores, with a peak performance of 3.087 petaflops.
- The Railway Technical Research Institute (RTRI) will install five XC50 cabinets and a 720 TB Cray ClusterStor L300 for storage to gain insights on rail transportation. This is their third Cray machine after acquiring an XC30 and CS300, both in 2013.
- Yokohama City University has selected the air-cooled XC50-AC for life sciences research.

=== New Zealand ===
- New Zealand Science Infrastructure (NeSI) is deploying a XC50 at their High Performance Computing Facility in Wellington.

=== South Korea ===
- The Institute for Basic Science (IBS) is installing a 1.43-petaflop XC50, named Aleph, for climate physics research.
- The Korea Institute of Fusion Energy (KFE) is installing a 1.56-petaflop XC50, named KAIROS, for Fusion plasma physics research.

=== Switzerland ===
- The Swiss National Supercomputing Centre in Lugano has a 361,760-core XC50 called Piz Daint. This has been upgraded from a Cray XC30 and Cray XC40 configurations.

=== United Kingdom ===
- Cray is developing a XC50 system with ARM processors called Isambard. This will be used for a consortium of Bristol, Bath, Cardiff and Exeter universities.
