= Laxmikant Kale =

Indian-American computer scientist

Laxmikant (Sanjay) V. Kale is the director of the Parallel Programming Laboratory (PPL) and a professor of computer science at the University of Illinois at Urbana-Champaign. He also holds department affiliations with the Beckman Institute and the Department of Mechanical and Industrial Engineering at Illinois.

== Charm++ ==
Professor Kale is perhaps best known for Charm++, a parallel object-oriented programming language based on C++. Under his leadership and direction, members of PPL developed (and continue to evolve) Charm++ and its predecessor, Chare Kernel, along with Adaptive MPI (AMPI). On top of this programming system, many parallel applications and libraries have been developed, such as NAMD, OpenAtom, Charisma, et al.

Professor Kale and his research group frequently collaborate with scientists in other disciplines to come up with novel ways of using high performance computing for scientific research and discovery. His research is guided by the principles of improving computer performance and human productivity in parallel programming.

== Research group ==
The Parallel Programming Laboratory (PPL) is Professor Kale's research group at the University of Illinois at Urbana-Champaign. The group is composed of research scientists and graduate and undergraduate research assistants in collaboration with domain scientists throughout the world. The group's current collaborations include NCSA's Blue Waters project and Virginia Tech's Contagion project, among others.

== Awards ==
Professor Kale was elevated to an ACM Fellow in December 2017 for his contributions to parallel programming and high performance computing. He was named the Paul and Cynthia Saylor Professor of Computer Science in November 2016. He was awarded the IEEE Sidney Fernbach award in 2012 and was recognized as an IEEE Fellow in November 2011 for "development of parallel programming techniques and awarded a Gordon Bell special prize in 2002 for NAMD: Biomolecular Simulation on Thousands of Processors, where "researchers achieved unprecedented scaling of the code that renders an atom-by-atom blueprint of large biomolecules and biomolecular systems." Other awards include the C. W. Gear Outstanding Junior Faculty Award, Department of Computer Science, University of Illinois at Urbana-Champaign, 1990 and ONR Young Investigator (1990–93).

== Education ==
Professor Kale earned his Ph.D. and M.S. in computer science from the State University of New York (SUNY), Stony Brook with David Scott Warren as his advisor. He earned a M.E. in computer science from the Indian Institute of Science (IISc), Bangalore, in 1979 and his undergraduate work was completed in 1977 at the Indian Institute of Technology, Banaras Hindu University, where he earned a B. Tech in Electrical Engineering.
