= International Cloud Experiment =

International Cloud Experiment (formally known as "Tropical Warm Pool International Cloud Experiment" - TWP-ICE) was a scientific mission to gather information on tropical storm formation. It involved seven airplanes, a ship anchored off Darwin in Australia, RV Southern Surveyor, and over 250 scientists and researchers.

The I.C.E. took place from 21 January to 23 February 2006, and had been in the planning stages since September 2003.

The experiment was a collaboration between the US Department of Energy Atmospheric Radiation Measurement (ARM) Program, the Bureau of Meteorology (Australia), NASA the European Commission DG RTD-1.2 and several United States, Australian, Canadian and European Universities.

During the experiment, a record-breaking tropical typhoon arose, then spent seven days as a "landphoon" over the Australian desert.

The Australian Broadcasting Corporation released in 2007 Thunderheads, a 47-minute program which has shown on the Smithsonian Channel.
