= National Operations Centre Tidal Unit =

The National Operations Centre Tidal Unit (formerly known as the National Tidal Centre) is a group of experts responsible for providing tidal tables and tidal predictions to the Australian Hydrographic Service. Their tidal predictions are also published on the Australian Bureau of Meteorology website.

The Unit also manages the national data archive for sea levels and tides. It is located within the South Australia regional office of the Bureau of Meteorology.

== History ==
The National Tidal Centre was established in January 2004 and brought into the public domain many of the functions of the former National Tidal Facility of Australia operated by Flinders University of South Australia until December 2003.

== Services and Projects ==
- Tidal Analysis and predictions for Australia, South Pacific and Antarctica;
- Sea level monitoring;
- Preparation of a Tidal Glossary of tide and sea level terms;
- Tsunami monitoring (as part of the Joint Australian Tsunami Warning Centre);
- Provision of information to the Hydrographer for the Royal Australian Navy;
- Supporting the Antarctic tide gauge network.
