= Bureau of Meteorology =

Australian government agency

- Logo used since October 2022

Agency overview
- Formed: 1 January 1908; 118 years ago
- Jurisdiction: Australia
- Headquarters: Melbourne
- Employees: 1,722
- Annual budget: A$359 million
- Minister responsible: Murray Watt, Minister for the Environment and Water
- Deputy Minister responsible: Josh Wilson, Assistant Minister for Climate Change and Energy
- Agency executive: Stuart Minchin, CEO and Director of Meteorology
- Parent department: Department of Climate Change, Energy, the Environment and Water
- Key documents: Meteorology Act 1955 (Cth); Water Act 2007 (Cth)
- Website: www.bom.gov.au

The Bureau of Meteorology (BOM or BoM) is an agency of the Australian Government that is responsible for providing weather forecasts and meteorological services to Australia and neighbouring countries. It was established in 1906 under the Meteorology Act 1955 (Cth), and brought together the state meteorological services that existed before then. The states officially transferred their weather recording responsibilities to the Bureau of Meteorology on 1 January 1908.

== History ==
=== Establishment ===
The Bureau of Meteorology was established on 1 January 1908 following the passage of the Meteorology Act 1906. Prior to Federation in 1901, each colony had had its own meteorological service, with all but two colonies also having a subsection devoted to astronomy. In August 1905, federal home affairs minister Littleton Groom surveyed state governments for their willingness to cede control, finding South Australia and Victoria unwilling. However, at a ministerial conference in April 1906, the state governments agreed to transfer responsibility for meteorology and astronomy to the federal government. Groom rejected a takeover of astronomy due to its connection to universities, which relied on state legislation for their authority.

Henry Ambrose Hunt was appointed as the first Commonwealth Meteorologist in November 1906. Initially, the Bureau had few staff and issued a single daily forecast for each state, transmitted by Morse code to country areas. Radio forecasts were introduced in 1924. The Bureau received additional funding from the late 1930s in the lead-up to World War II, and it was incorporated into the Royal Australian Air Force (RAAF) from 1941 until after the conclusion of the war. It became an inaugural member of the World Meteorological Organization (WMO) in 1950. Televised weather forecasts were introduced in 1956.

=== Reorganisation and expansion ===
The 1906 act governing the Bureau was repealed and replaced by the Meteorology Act 1955, which brought its functions in line with the expectations of the WMO and allowed for a significant reorganisation of its structure. At this time, the Bureau came under the Department of the Interior. In 1957, partly as a response to the 1955 Hunter Valley floods, the Bureau added a hydrometeorological service. In 1964, the federal government agreed to establish one of the three World Meteorological Centres in Melbourne, as part of the WMO's World Weather Watch scheme. The BOM also gained additional responsibilities under the Water Act 2007 as the custodian of the nation's water information.

=== Twenty-first century ===
In October 2022, the BOM requested media organisations and outlets to update their style guides so that the agency was to be referred to as the "Bureau of Meteorology" in the first instance and "the Bureau" in subsequent professional references, in line with other governmental agencies and the Meteorology Act 1955. The decision was reversed that week. During this period, the media cycle on this story led to death threats sent from the public to the organisation and were received by general staff, scientists, meteorologists, and other specialists within the organisation, those of which had no input or were a part of the request. Some BOM employees at the time requested not to have their name used during live media crosses as a safety precaution. The style guide change was unclear as to whether the BOM also wanted the public to stop calling them the "BOM".

On 22 October 2025, the BOM released an updated website for the first time in 12 years with a new design and functionality, including https; however, it caused a public backlash mainly due to changes in navigation and the radar display. The change was described by some as "confusing", "clunky" and "really bad." 7News weather presenter Tony Auden said of the changes to the radar: "While it's never been properly defined, we've always had a rule of thumb that black on the radar means hail, and it's worked pretty well over the years...The new BOM radar view has essentially clipped the top end of the radar scale at orange, so we can't see any detail in the biggest storms ... This left a lot of people in the dark about the threat to their homes during the height of the severe weather yesterday."

Queensland Premier David Crisafulli said "the changes to the website don't make sense", while federal Nationals leader David Littleproud said people in his rural Queensland electorate "were not given the information they needed after the recent rain event". On 29 October, the federal Environment Minister Murray Watt and Climate Change Minister Chris Bowen said the bureau had lost its social licence because of the website upgrade and demanded urgent changes. Watt wrote in a statement: "It's clear that the new BOM website is not meeting many users' expectations, with a significant range of feedback provided to the Bureau in recent days ... I made clear my expectations that the BoM needed to consider this feedback and, where appropriate, adjust the website's settings as soon as possible." Also on 29 October, the BOM apologised for the changes and said "adjustments" will be made. The re-design by Deloitte and the digital infrastructure by Accenture cost a total of $96.5 million, against an original budget of $31 million.

== Services and structure ==
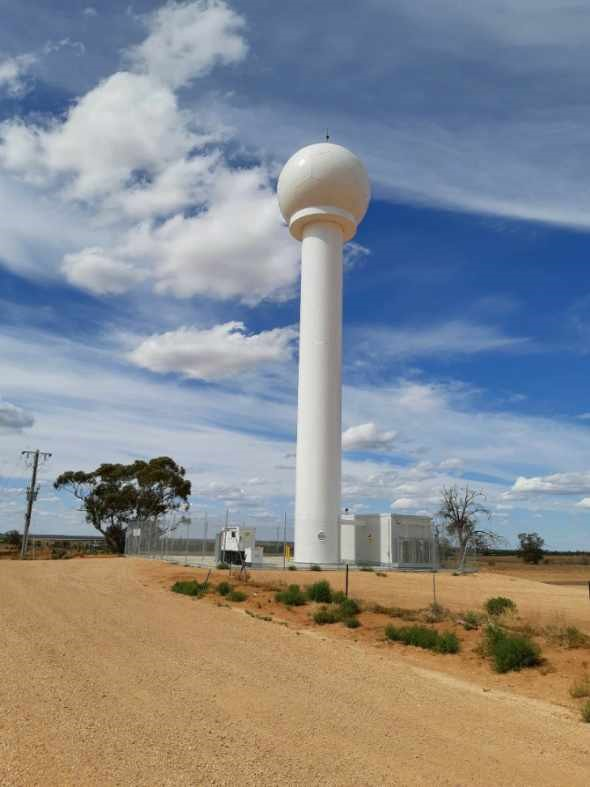
A weather radar in Mildura, Victoria operated by the Bureau of Meteorology

The Bureau of Meteorology is the main provider of weather forecasts, warnings and observations to the Australian public.

The Bureau's head office had traditionally been in Melbourne since its creation in 1908. Since 2020, the Bureau has restructured its operations and moved to a more distributed staffing arrangement with functions spread over its capital city offices. The current Melbourne office at 700 Collins Street in Melbourne Docklands was established in 2004 and remains its largest staffed office.

Offices are located in each state and territory capital as well as offices in Cairns and Townsville. Specialist functions such as Regional Forecasting Centres (RFCs), Flood Warning Centres, the National Tidal Centre, the Volcanic Ash Advisory Centre, the Regional Specialised Meteorological Centre (Analysis), Bureau National Operations Centre (BNOC) and the Tropical Cyclone Warning Centres have been reorganised and distributed across the Bureau's offices with a major concentration of forecasting operations in Brisbane and Melbourne Docklands. The Australian Bureau of Meteorology issues tropical cyclone advices and developed the Standard Emergency Warning Signal used for warnings. The Bureau is responsible for tropical cyclone naming for storms in waters surrounding Australia. Three lists of names used to be maintained, one for each of the western, northern and eastern Australian regions. However, as of the start of the 2008–09 Tropical Cyclone Year these lists have been rolled into one main national list of tropical cyclone names.

The Bureau maintained a network of field offices across the continent but has generally de-staffed these facilities, except at capital city airports, Giles Meteorological Station, on remote overseas islands, and in Antarctica. Capital city airport offices are scheduled for automation by 2027. In 2011 there was also a network of some 300 paid co-operative observers and approximately 6,000 voluntary rainfall observers, though this number is expected to have reduced over time with increased automation. In 2022 the Australian National Audit Office (ANAO) produced an audit report entitled "Bureau of Meteorology's Management of Assets in its Observing Network".

The Bureau of Meteorology has been accused of being influenced by oil and gas giants such as Santos, Chevron and Woodside to downplay the effects of climate change to "please their leaders". Sentences in the Bureau's report on the 2019–20 Australian bushfire season were censored and/or modified to remove references to climate change and long-term warming trends. Additionally, staff time and supercomputer modelling resources were regularly directed from core services to supporting commercial offshore oil and gas ventures outside of appropriate commercial fee-for-service arrangements at below-cost, given the significant expense of running the resources.

In March 2025, research from Pollster DemosAU identified the Bureau of Meteorology as Australia's most trusted national institution, ahead of the CSIRO, the Australian Electoral Commission and others.

== Directors ==
The following people have been directors of the Bureau of Meteorology:

- 1908–1931: Henry Ambrose Hunt
- 1931–1940: William S Watt
- 1940–1950: H. Norman Warren
- 1950–1955: Edward W Timcke
- 1955–1962: Leonard J Dwyer
- 1962–1978: William J Gibbs
- 1978–2003: John Zillman
- 2003–2008: Geoff Love
- 2008–2009: Neville Smith (Acting Director)
- 2009–2012: Greg Ayers
- 2012–2016: Rob Vertessy
- 2016–Sep 2025: Andrew Johnson
- Sep 2025–Nov 2025: Peter Stone (Acting Director)
- Nov 2025–present: Stuart Minchin

== High performance computing ==
On 30 June 2016, a Cray XC40 supercomputer was put into service by the Bureau. It was named Australis and it was expected to be 16 times faster than the existing High Performance Computer (HPC) with a total of 1.6 petaflops of computational power, providing the operational computing capability for weather, climate, ocean and wave numerical prediction and simulation. The Bureau performs numerical weather prediction with the Unified Model software.

The Bureau decommissioned its Oracle system in October 2016. In 2020, the Bureau decommissioned the central computing facility, which had previously been relocated to the Melbourne office in 2004, and was first commissioned in 1974. In April 2020, the Bureau received Australis II, a 4.0 petaflop Cray XC50 and CS500 system, which was expected to be operational in August 2024 after several lengthy delays.

Two years later, the Bureau bought a disaster recovery (DR) HPC system to improve the resilience of the supercomputer used to predict Australia's weather events. Hewlett Packard Enterprise will supply the DR HPC system under a three-year contract worth A$49.3 million, supplementing the existing Australis II.

== See also ==
- World Meteorological Organization, co-ordination body for weather, climate and environment services
- International Cloud Experiment, which collected data on tropical cyclones in January and February 2006
- 2026–27 Australian region cyclone season
- Water Data Transfer Format
- National Council for Fire & Emergency Services
