= Henry Ambrose Hunt =

British-Australian meteorologist (1866–1946)

Henry Ambrose Hunt (7 February 1866 – 7 February 1946) was a British meteorologist noted for his contribution to meteorology in his adopted home of Australia. He was Director of the Australian Bureau of Meteorology between 1908 and 1931.

== Early life ==
Hunt was born in London to Edwin Hunt, a marine engineer, and his wife Annie (née Padley). As a child, he spent three years in St Petersburg with his father who was managing the Baltic Ironworks and designing battleship engines for the Russian Czar. On his return to England he won a scholarship in mathematics to Dartford Grammar School in Kent. In March 1884 his family emigrated to Sydney, Australia.

== Career ==
Hunt began working with the government astronomer Henry Chamberlain Russell at the Observatory, becoming a meteorological assistant in January 1886, and promoted to second meteorological assistant in 1890. In this role he was responsible for the daily weather report, and also worked with Russell's project studying anti-cyclones in the Southern Hemisphere. In 1894 his work was recognised with the Ralph Abercromby prize for "An Essay on Southerly Bursters", and also the next year with "Types of Australian Weather", a wide-ranging survey on meteorology in Australia. He was appointed head meteorologist in 1904, and immediately sent on a world tour to survey the most modern meteorological techniques.

In late 1906, Hunt, by now a fellow of the Royal Meteorological Society, was appointed inaugural head of the nascent Commonwealth Meteorological Bureau in Melbourne, the agency responsible for developing and unifying Australian meteorological services to satisfy the developing needs of industry. On 20–23 May 1907 Hunt convened a conference in Melbourne intended to standardise meteorological practices throughout Australia. As a result of his efforts, a unified national service was created, and began operating on 1 January 1908. As head meteorologist, his expert advice was also consulted on the climate of the proposed new seat of government in Canberra. Initially, Hunt's main area of research was synoptic meteorology, but in 1913 he co-authored (with Griffith Taylor and E.T. Quayle) a textbook, The Climate and Weather of Australia, the first of its kind in Australia.

He developed a number of new meteorological theories, collected in a 1929 book A basis for seasonal forecasting in Australia. In this book he proposed a four-year weather cycle, according to which non-meteorological factors such as vegetation were causally linked to weather patterns. This theory led to new research into the relationship between the weather cycle and droughts. Before his forced retirement on 6 February 1931, Hunt was considered the foremost weather expert in Australia with an estimated 87% strike rate. One of his most highly regarded achievements was his successful battle, through the First World War and Great Depression, to obtain the resources to grow and professionalise Australia's meteorological service to meet the demands of military and industry.

== Personal life and public persona ==
As a public figure in charge of an often fallible, yet necessary proto-science, the "somewhat reserved and mild-mannered" Hunt was often lampooned by the Australian press, particularly the satirical Melbourne Punch, who regularly featured him humorously, if affectionately, in the "People We Know" series. The magazine described him as "a pleasant, meek, well-fed gentleman, who seems quite out of place in control of such an untameable gang as the Australian weather elements... it would be hard to say what his percentage of correct predictions is, but this is certain, that it would be a high one".

Outside of his public profile Hunt was a reserved and private person, with a passion for chess, and was an expert handyman and amateur inventor. His innovations included a 'rotating rain clock' and a pressure-cube anemometer to record wind pressure, velocity and direction simultaneously.

He died of myocarditis at his home in Elwood, Victoria on his 80th birthday and was buried in Brighton cemetery. On 11 December 1899 at St Paul's Church of England, Redfern, Sydney, he had married Wilhelmina Eve Linden, who predeceased him. Two of their three daughters survived him.
