= Cray XC40 =

Supercomputer manufactured by Cray

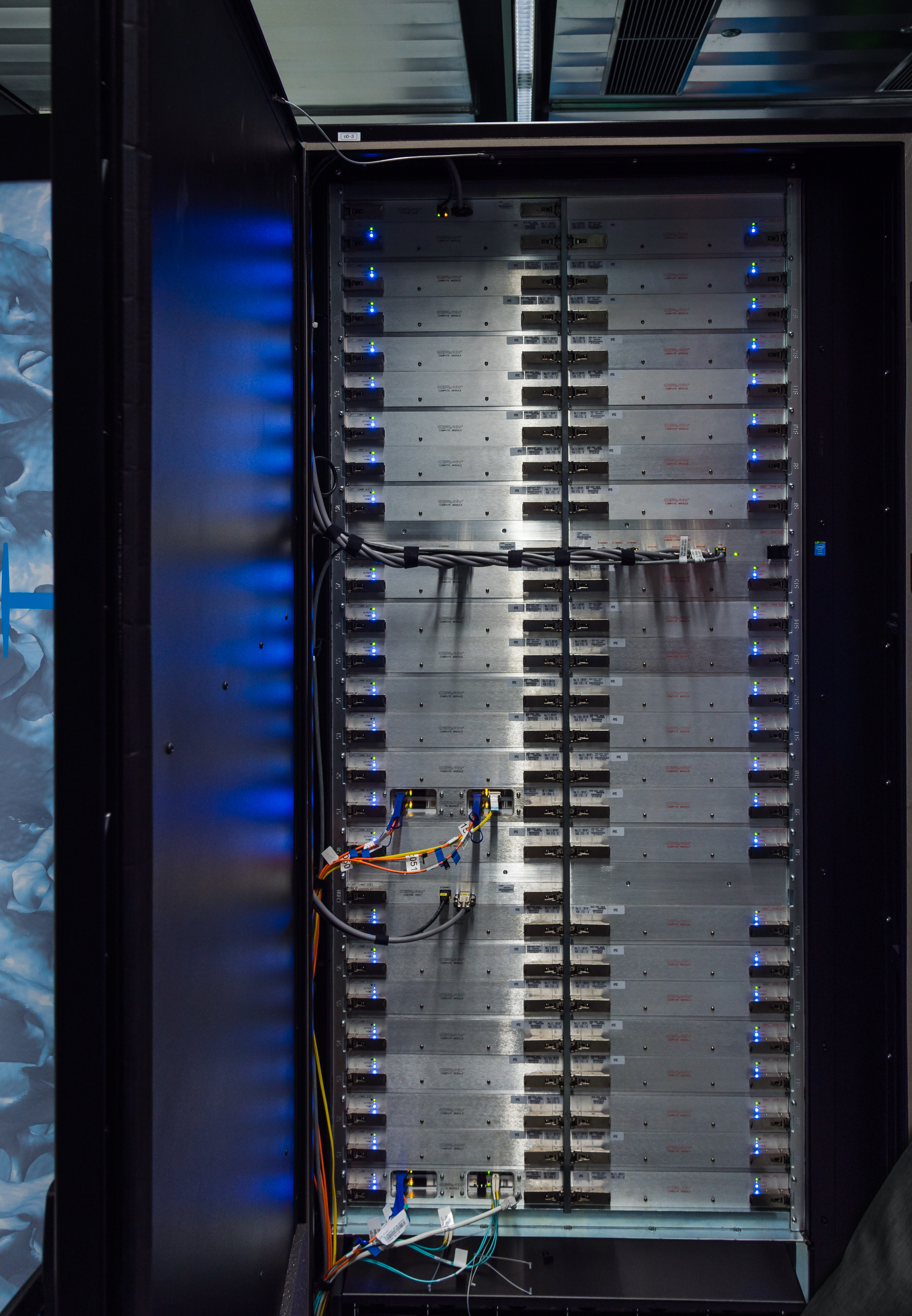
XC40 cabinet (front) with 48 blades in groups of 16, each blade containing 4 nodes

The Cray XC40 is a massively parallel multiprocessor supercomputer manufactured by Cray. It consists of Intel Haswell Xeon processors, with optional Nvidia Tesla or Intel Xeon Phi accelerators, connected together by Cray's proprietary "Aries" interconnect, stored in air-cooled or liquid-cooled cabinets. The XC series supercomputers are available with the Cray DataWarp applications I/O accelerator technology.

== Deployed systems ==
=== Australia ===
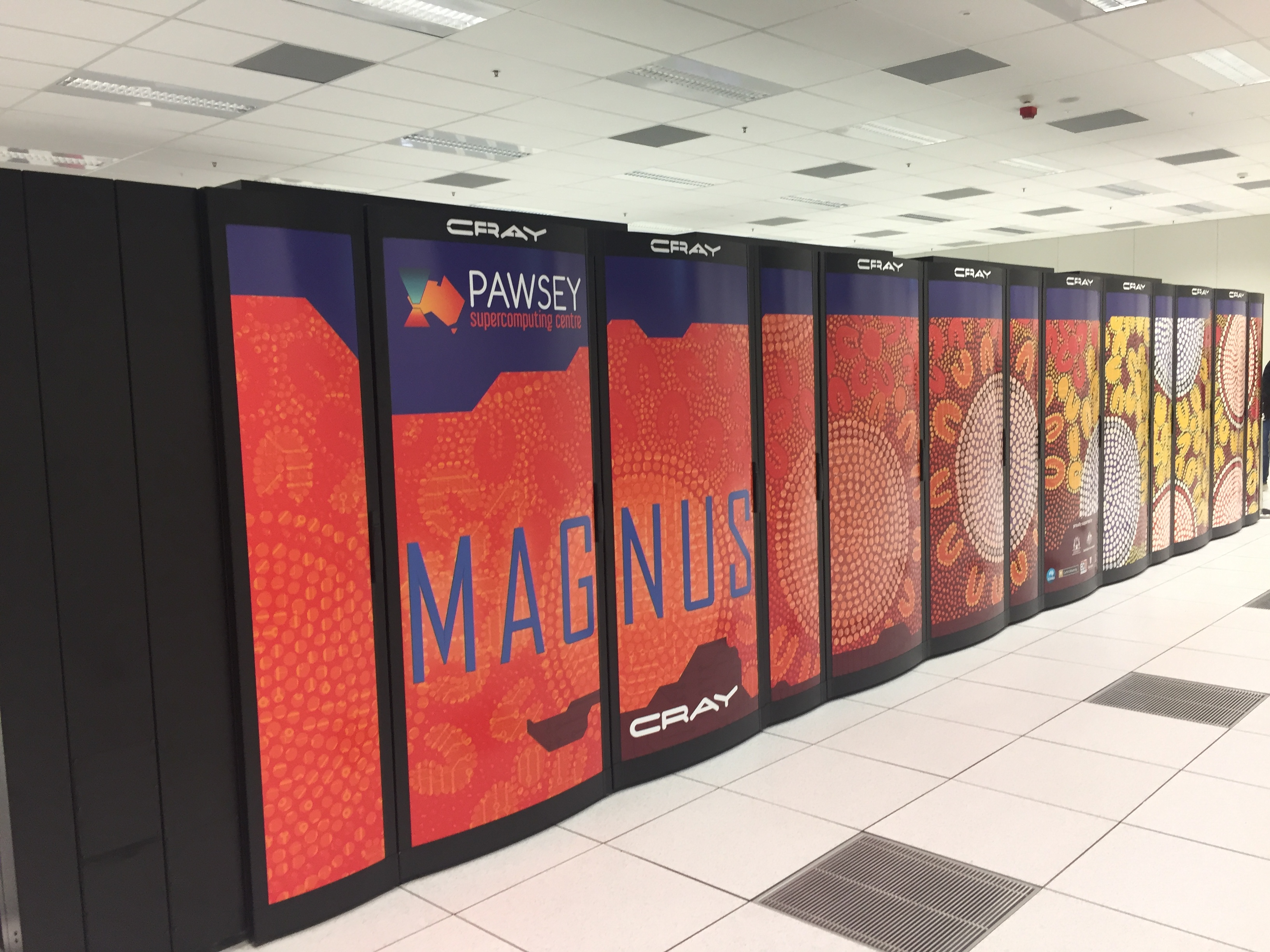
XC40 unit Magnus at the Pawsey Supercomputing Centre in Kensington, Western Australia

- The Pawsey Supercomputing Centre has a 35,712-core XC40 called "Magnus" for general science research. This supercomputer has a processing power of 1.097 petaflops.
- The Bureau of Meteorology has a 51,840-core XC40 called "Australis" with 276 TB of RAM and a usable storage of 4.3 PB. The supercomputer with a peak performance of 1.6 petaflops provides the operational computing capability for weather, climate, ocean and wave numerical prediction and simulation.

=== Finland ===
- National IT center for science CSC computer "Sisu" was completed as XC40 in 2014. It has 40,512 cores with overall peak performance of 1,688 TFlops.

=== Germany ===
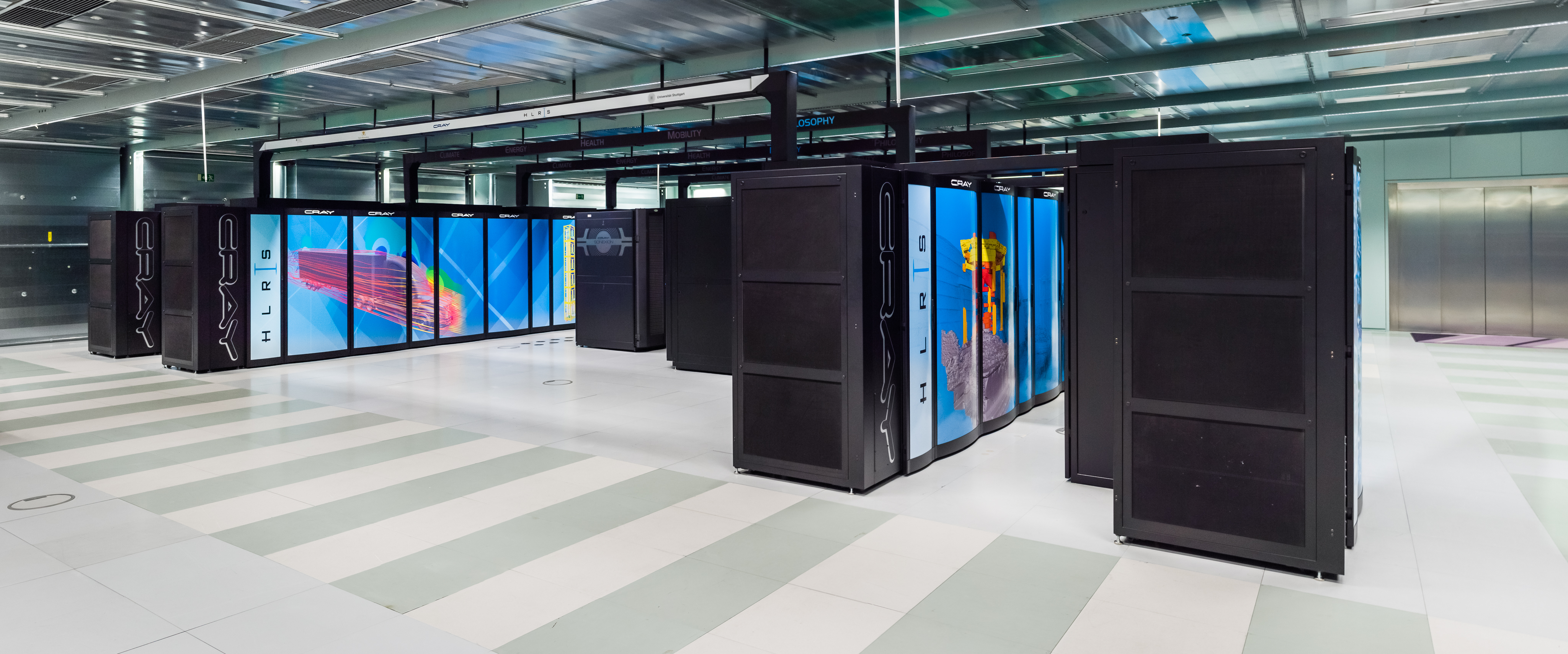
Cray XC40 "Hazel Hen" at the HLRS

- High Performance Computing Center, Stuttgart (HLRS) has built a 185,088-core XC40 named "Hazel Hen" with a peak performance of 7420 TFlops.

=== India ===
- Supercomputer Education and Research Centre (SERC) at the Indian Institute of Science has an XC40 supercomputer named SahasraT, with 1,376 compute nodes (33,024 Intel Haswell Xeon cores), together with Intel Xeon Phi and NVIDIA K40 GPU accelerators.
- Pratyush and Mihir are the supercomputers established at Indian Institute of Tropical Meteorology (IITM), Pune and National Center for Medium Range Weather Forecast (NCMRWF) respectively. Pratyush and Mihir are two High Performance Computing (HPC) units. They are located at two government institutes, one being 4.0 PetaFlops unit at IITM, Pune and another 2.8 PetaFlops unit at the National Centre for Medium Range Weather Forecasting (NCMRWF), Noida. Both units and provides a combined output of 6.8 PetaFlops.

=== Japan ===
The Center for Computational Astrophysics at the National Astronomical Observatory of Japan have an XC40 system named "ATERUI". This is an upgrade from a previous Cray XC30 system.

=== Poland ===
- Interdisciplinary Centre for Mathematical and Computational Modelling in Warsaw has an XC40 supercomputer named Okeanos with 1084 compute nodes (26,016 Intel Xeon cores) with 128 GB of RAM each.

=== Saudi Arabia ===
- King Abdullah University of Science and Technology (KAUST) has an XC40 named Shaheen. The processing power is 5.54 petaflops with 196,608 cores.

=== Sweden ===
- Royal Institute of Technology has a 53,632-core XC40 called "Beskow".

=== Switzerland ===
- The Swiss National Supercomputing Centre in Lugano had a system in 2013 named Piz Dora, a Cray XC40 with 1256 compute nodes. This has been combined with the old Piz Daint system into the new Cray XC50 Piz Daint.

=== United Kingdom ===
- The UK Met Office has three XC40s, with a total of 460,000 cores, capable of 14 petaflops peak. It is currently the fastest machine in the world dedicated to weather and climate modeling, and was the 11th fastest (but is no longer) on the TOP500 list when it was installed.

=== United States ===
- The United States Army Research Laboratory has an XC40 supercomputer called "Excalibur". This computer has 100,064 cores.
- The Lawrence Berkeley National Laboratory has an XC40 supercomputer called "Cori" with 76,416 Intel Haswell cores and 658,784 Xeon Phi Knights Landing cores.
- Petroleum Geo-Services has an XC40 supercomputer used for the processing of complex seismic data sets.
- The Bowie State University has an XC40 supercomputer called "Sphinx". This computer has 12,740 processing cores.
- Indiana University has an XC40 supercomputer called "Big Red 3", with 22,464 processing cores.
- Argonne Leadership Computing Facility has an XC40 supercomputer called "Theta".
