= SXM (socket) =

High-performance computing socket

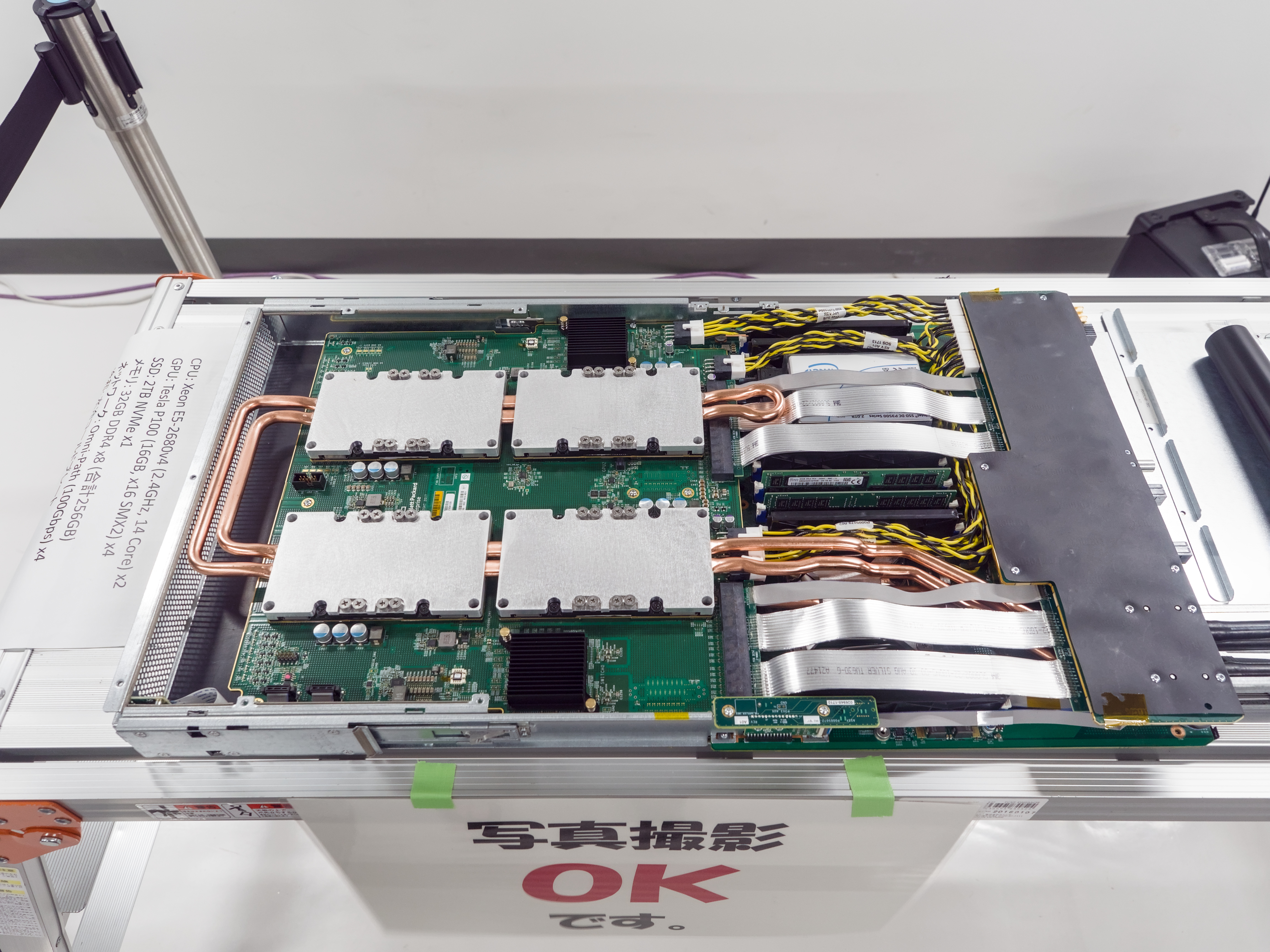
Computing node of TSUBAME 3.0 supercomputer showing four Nvidia Tesla P100 SXM modules

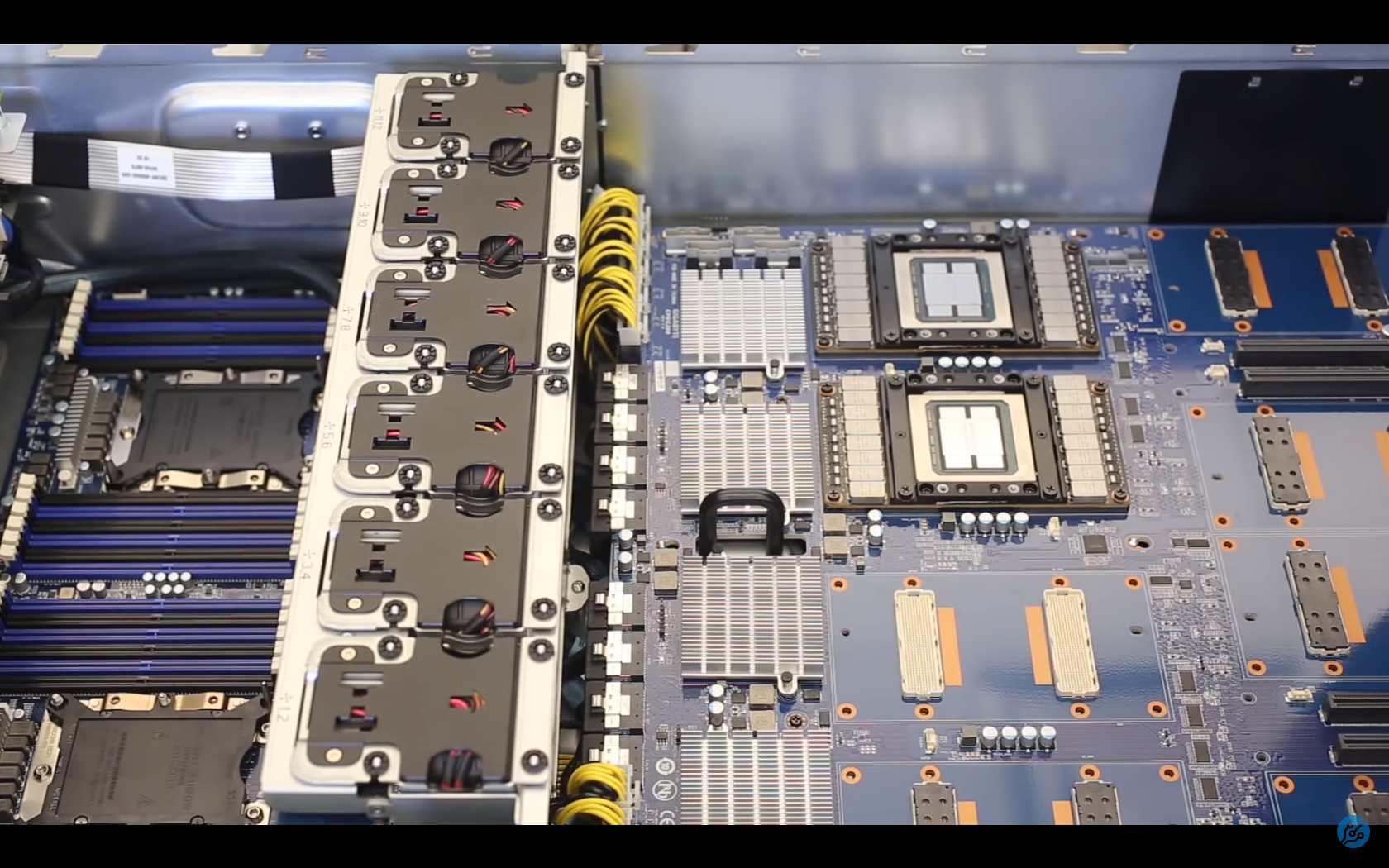
Bare SXM sockets next to sockets with GPUs installed

SXM (Server PCI Express Module) is a high bandwidth socket solution for connecting Nvidia Compute Accelerators to a system. Each generation of Nvidia Tesla since the P100 models, the DGX computer series, and the HGX board series come with an SXM socket type that provides high bandwidth and power delivery for the GPU daughter cards. Nvidia offers these combinations as an end-user product e.g. in their models of the DGX system series. Current socket generations are SXM for Pascal based GPUs, SXM2 and SXM3 for Volta based GPUs, SXM4 for Ampere based GPUs, and SXM5 for Hopper based GPUs. These sockets are used for specific models of these accelerators, and offer higher performance per card than PCIe equivalents. The DGX-1 system was the first to be equipped with SXM-2 sockets and thus was the first to carry the form factor compatible SXM modules with P100 GPUs and later was unveiled to be capable of allowing upgrading to (or being pre-equipped with) SXM2 modules with V100 GPUs.

== Technical details ==
SXM boards are typically built with four or eight GPU slots, although some solutions such as the Nvidia DGX-2 connect multiple boards to deliver high performance. While third party solutions for SXM boards exist, most systems integrators such as Supermicro use prebuilt Nvidia HGX boards, which come in four or eight socket configurations. This solution greatly lowers the cost and difficulty of SXM based GPU servers, and enables compatibility and reliability across all boards of the same generation.

SXM modules on e.g. HGX boards, particularly recent generations, may have NVLink switches to allow faster GPU-to-GPU communication. This further reduces bottlenecks which would normally be imposed by CPU and PCIe limitations. The GPUs on the daughter cards use NVLink as their main communication protocol. For example, a Hopper-based H100 SXM5 based GPU can use up to 900 GB/s of bandwidth across 18 NVLink 4 channels, with each contributing a 50 GB/s of bandwidth; In contrast, PCIe 5.0 can handle up to 64 GB/s of bandwidth within a x16 slot. This high bandwidth also means that GPUs can share memory over the NVLink bus, allowing an entire HGX board to present to the host system as a single, massive GPU.

Power delivery is also handled by the SXM socket, negating the need for external power cables such as those needed in PCIe equivalent cards. This, combined with the horizontal mounting, allows more efficient cooling mechanisms, which in turn allow SXM-based GPUs to operate at a much higher thermal design power (TDP). The Hopper-based H100, for example, can draw up to 700 W solely from the SXM socket. The lack of cabling also makes assembling and repairing of large systems much easier, and also reduces the number of possible points of failure.

Comparison of accelerators used in DGX:

Model	Architecture	Socket	FP32 CUDA cores	FP64 cores (excl. tensor)	Mixed INT32/FP32 cores	INT32 cores	Boost clock	Memory clock	Memory bus width	Memory bandwidth	VRAM	Single precision (FP32)	Double precision (FP64)	INT8 (non-tensor)	INT8 dense tensor	INT32	FP4 dense tensor	FP16	FP16 dense tensor	bfloat16 dense tensor	TensorFloat-32 (TF32) dense tensor	FP64 dense tensor	Interconnect (NVLink)	GPU	L1 Cache	L2 Cache	TDP	Die size	Transistor count	Process	Launched
P100	Pascal	SXM/SXM2	3584	1792	N/A	N/A	1480 MHz	1.4 Gbit/s HBM2	4096-bit	720 GB/sec	16 GB HBM2	10.6 TFLOPS	5.3 TFLOPS	N/A	N/A	N/A	N/A	21.2 TFLOPS	N/A	N/A	N/A	N/A	160 GB/sec	GP100	1344 KB (24 KB × 56)	4096 KB	300 W	610 mm^{2}	15.3 B	TSMC 16FF+	Q2 2016
V100 16GB	Volta	SXM2	5120	2560	N/A	5120	1530 MHz	1.75 Gbit/s HBM2	4096-bit	900 GB/sec	16 GB HBM2	15.7 TFLOPS	7.8 TFLOPS	62 TOPS	N/A	15.7 TOPS	N/A	31.4 TFLOPS	125 TFLOPS	N/A	N/A	N/A	300 GB/sec	GV100	10240 KB (128 KB × 80)	6144 KB	300 W	815 mm^{2}	21.1 B	TSMC 12FFN	Q3 2017
V100 32GB	Volta	SXM3	5120	2560	N/A	5120	1530 MHz	1.75 Gbit/s HBM2	4096-bit	900 GB/sec	32 GB HBM2	15.7 TFLOPS	7.8 TFLOPS	62 TOPS	N/A	15.7 TOPS	N/A	31.4 TFLOPS	125 TFLOPS	N/A	N/A	N/A	300 GB/sec	GV100	10240 KB (128 KB × 80)	6144 KB	350 W	815 mm^{2}	21.1 B	TSMC 12FFN	Q3 2017
A100 40GB	Ampere	SXM4	6912	3456	6912	N/A	1410 MHz	2.4 Gbit/s HBM2	5120-bit	1.52 TB/sec	40 GB HBM2	19.5 TFLOPS	9.7 TFLOPS	N/A	624 TOPS	19.5 TOPS	N/A	78 TFLOPS	312 TFLOPS	312 TFLOPS	156 TFLOPS	19.5 TFLOPS	600 GB/sec	GA100	20736 KB (192 KB × 108)	40960 KB	400 W	826 mm^{2}	54.2 B	TSMC N7	Q1 2020
A100 80GB	Ampere	SXM4	6912	3456	6912	N/A	1410 MHz	3.2 Gbit/s HBM2e	5120-bit	1.52 TB/sec	80 GB HBM2e	19.5 TFLOPS	9.7 TFLOPS	N/A	624 TOPS	19.5 TOPS	N/A	78 TFLOPS	312 TFLOPS	312 TFLOPS	156 TFLOPS	19.5 TFLOPS	600 GB/sec	GA100	20736 KB (192 KB × 108)	40960 KB	400 W	826 mm^{2}	54.2 B	TSMC N7	Q1 2020
H100	Hopper	SXM5	16896	4608	16896	N/A	1980 MHz	5.2 Gbit/s HBM3	5120-bit	3.35 TB/sec	80 GB HBM3	67 TFLOPS	34 TFLOPS	N/A	1.98 POPS	N/A	N/A	N/A	990 TFLOPS	990 TFLOPS	495 TFLOPS	67 TFLOPS	900 GB/sec	GH100	25344 KB (192 KB × 132)	51200 KB	700 W	814 mm^{2}	80 B	TSMC 4N	Q3 2022
H200	Hopper	SXM5	16896	4608	16896	N/A	1980 MHz	6.3 Gbit/s HBM3e	6144-bit	4.8 TB/sec	141 GB HBM3e	67 TFLOPS	34 TFLOPS	N/A	1.98 POPS	N/A	N/A	N/A	990 TFLOPS	990 TFLOPS	495 TFLOPS	67 TFLOPS	900 GB/sec	GH100	25344 KB (192 KB × 132)	51200 KB	1000 W	814 mm^{2}	80 B	TSMC 4N	Q3 2023
B100	Blackwell	SXM6	N/A	N/A	N/A	N/A	N/A	8 Gbit/s HBM3e	8192-bit	8 TB/sec	192 GB HBM3e	N/A	N/A	N/A	3.5 POPS	N/A	7 PFLOPS	N/A	1.98 PFLOPS	1.98 PFLOPS	989 TFLOPS	30 TFLOPS	1.8 TB/sec	GB100	N/A	N/A	700 W	N/A	208 B	TSMC 4NP	Q4 2024
B200	Blackwell	SXM6	N/A	N/A	N/A	N/A	N/A	8 Gbit/s HBM3e	8192-bit	8 TB/sec	192 GB HBM3e	N/A	N/A	N/A	4.5 POPS	N/A	9 PFLOPS	N/A	2.25 PFLOPS	2.25 PFLOPS	1.2 PFLOPS	40 TFLOPS	1.8 TB/sec	GB100	N/A	N/A	1000 W	N/A	208 B	TSMC 4NP	Q4 2024

== See also ==
- Tegra – System on a chip by Nvidia
