= Piz Dora =

Mountain in Switzerland

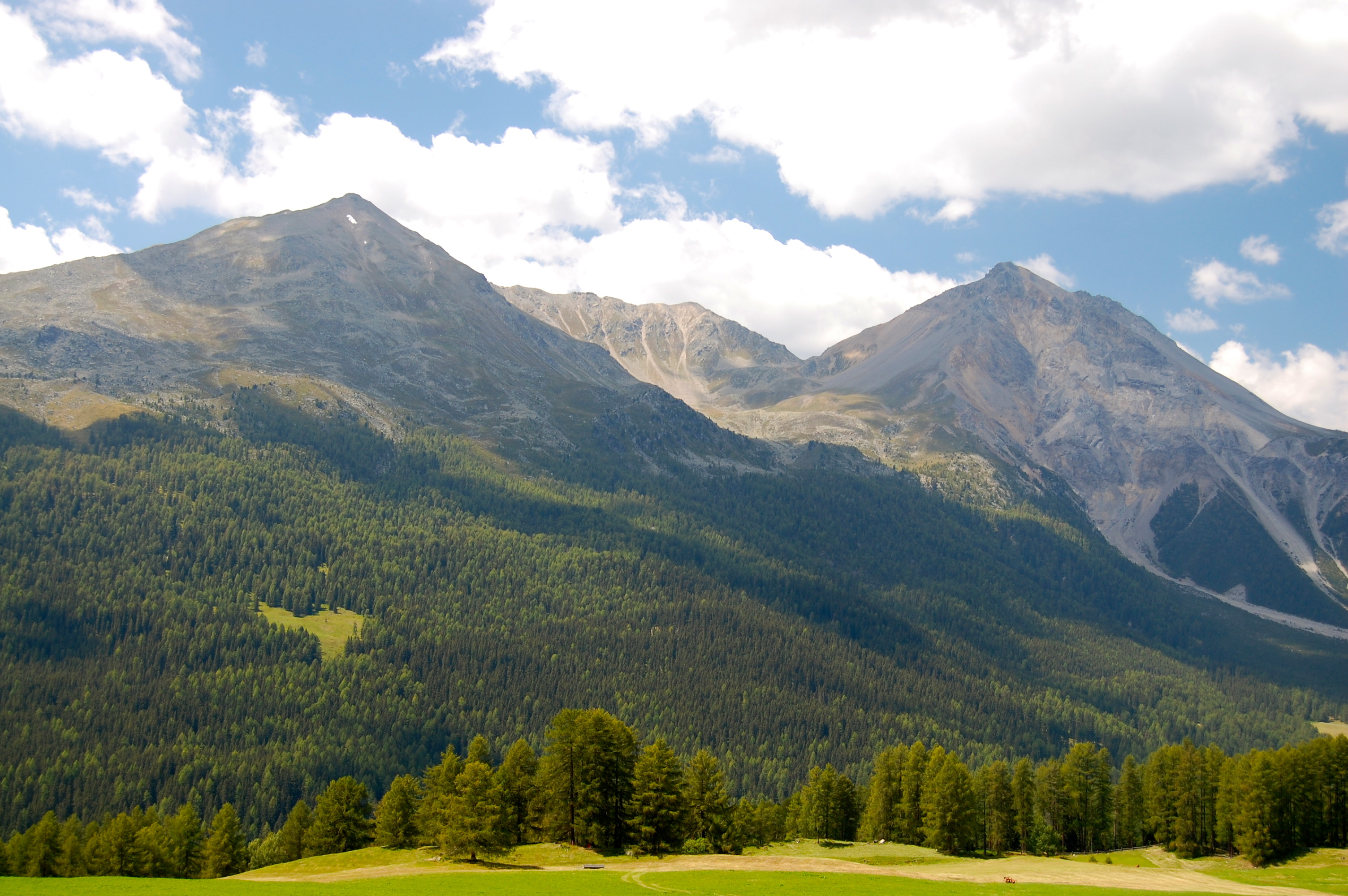
- Piz Dora (left) and Piz Daint (right) from the east

Highest point
- Elevation: 2,951 m (9,682 ft)
- Prominence: 270 m (890 ft)
- Parent peak: Piz Daint
- Coordinates: 46°36′18″N 10°18′22″E

Geography
- Location within Switzerland
- Location: Graubünden, Switzerland
- Parent range: Ortler Alps

Piz Dora (2,951 m) is a mountain of the Ortler Alps, overlooking Tschierv in the canton of Graubünden. It lies south of Piz Daint, on the range between the Val Mora and the Val Müstair.
