= Piz Daint =

Mountain in Switzerland

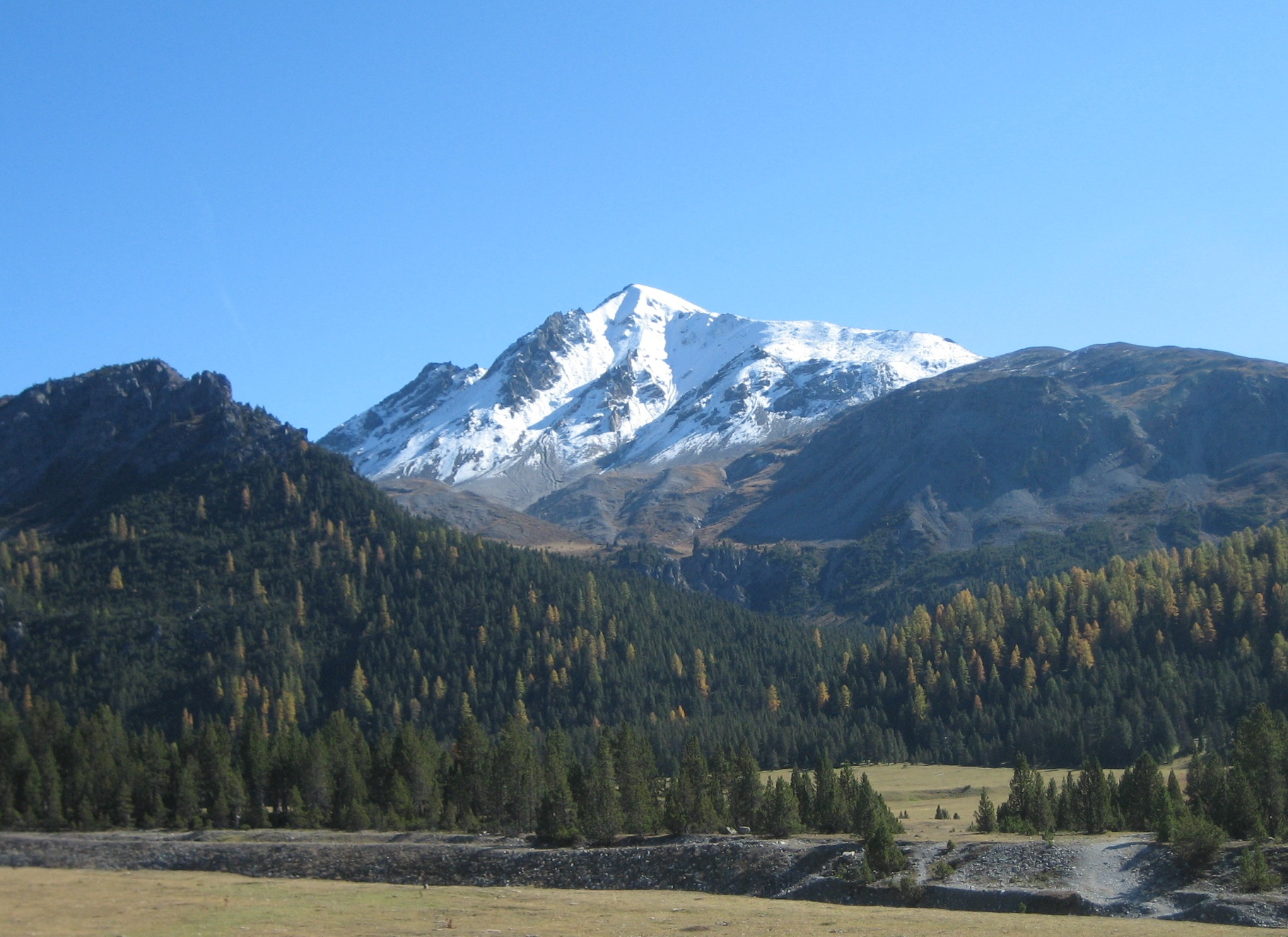
- View from near the Ofen Pass (north side)

Highest point
- Elevation: 2,968 m (9,738 ft)
- Prominence: 734 m (2,408 ft)
- Parent peak: Ortler
- Listing: Alpine mountains 2500-2999 m
- Coordinates: 46°37′07.5″N 10°17′27.4″E

Geography
- Location within Switzerland
- Location: Graubünden, Switzerland
- Parent range: Ortler Alps

Piz Daint (Romansh: [pits ˈdajnt]) is a mountain of the Swiss Ortler Alps, overlooking the Ofen Pass in the canton of Graubünden. The closest locality is Tschierv on the north side.

== Name ==
The name was originally spelled Piz d'Aint, which is Romansh for "inner peak". The name is relative to the peak to the east called Piz d'Ora, meaning "outer peak". It corresponds to the local naming convention.

The name was officially changed to Piz Daint towards the end of the 20th century.

== Other uses ==
Piz Daint is the namesake of the CSCS supercomputer announced in 2013.

== See also ==
- Piz Dora
