= Cray XC30 =

Supercomputer manufactured by Cray

The Cray XC30 is a massively parallel multiprocessor supercomputer manufactured by Cray. It consists of Intel Xeon processors, with optional Nvidia Tesla or Xeon Phi accelerators, connected together by Cray's proprietary "Aries" interconnect, stored in air-cooled or liquid-cooled cabinets. Each liquid-cooled cabinet can contain up to 48 blades, each with eight CPU sockets, and uses 90 kW of power. The XC series supercomputers are available with the Cray DataWarp applications I/O accelerator technology.

In 2014, the Cray XC30 systems appear prominently on the TOP500 supercomputer lists.

== Deployed Cray XC30 systems ==
=== Europe ===
- The Swedish Royal Institute of Technology has a XC30 system. The system has a four year budget of SEK 170 million.
- The UK's national high-performance computing facility in Edinburgh has a 118,080-core XC30 called "ARCHER," which cost £43 million.
- There is a 115,984-core XC30 system called "Piz Daint" at the Swiss National Supercomputing Centre, located in southern Switzerland.
- The ECMWF also uses two XC30 to predict the weather.
- The Deutscher Wetterdienst has two XC30s (for redundancy), also used for weather prediction.
- The Danish Meteorological Institute operates a dual XC30 (located at the Icelandic Meteorological Office due to cheaper cooling and electricity). The same supercomputer is used by Iceland to predict national and surrounding weather.

=== Japan ===
The Center for Computational Astrophysics at the National Astronomical Observatory of Japan had a XC30 system named "ATERUI". This was upgraded to a Cray XC40 system.

=== United States ===
- The NERSC has a 133,824-core XC30 called "Edison."
- A 225,984-core XC30 system is installed at an undisclosed government location.
- The Air Force Research Laboratory has an XC30 called "Lightning."
- The US Naval Academy has an XC30 hosted at the University of Maryland Institute for Advanced Computer Studies, named "Grace" after Rear Admiral Grace Hopper.

=== Australia ===
- The Pawsey Supercomputing Centre has a 9,440-core XC30 called "Galaxy." One chassis of this contains GPUs; the rest is all-CPU. Its November 2013 and June 2014, TOP500 entries were before the GPU chassis was installed. This system is used for radio astronomy.
