= Cray XE6 =

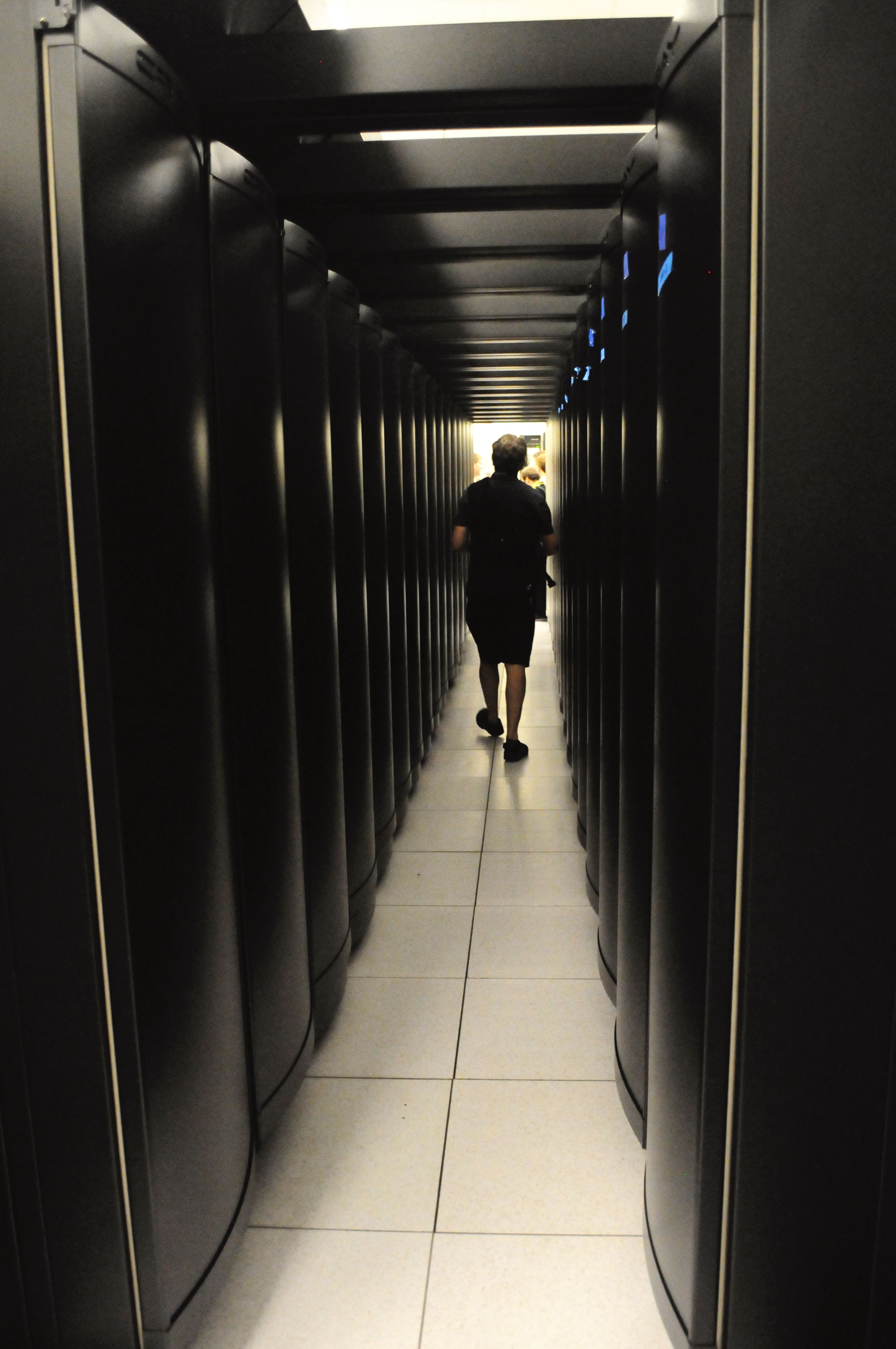
A person walking between the racks of a Cray XE6

The Cray XE6 (codename during development: Baker) made by Cray is an enhanced version of the Cray XT6 supercomputer, officially announced on 25 May 2010. The XE6 uses the same computer blade found in the XT6, with eight- or 12-core Opteron 6100 processors giving up to 3,072 cores per cabinet, but replaces the SeaStar2+ interconnect router used in the Cray XT5 and XT6 with the faster and more scalable Gemini router ASIC. This is used to provide a 3-dimensional torus network topology between nodes. Each XE6 node has two processor sockets and either 32 or 64 GB of DDR3 SDRAM memory. Two nodes share one Gemini router ASIC.

The XE6 runs the Cray Linux Environment version 3. This incorporates SUSE Linux Enterprise Server and Cray's Compute Node Linux.
