= Nvidia Tesla =

Nvidia's line of general purpose GPUs

- Manufacturer: Nvidia
- Introduced: May 2, 2007; 19 years ago
- Discontinued: The Tesla branding was discontinued in May 2020; 6 years ago—now branded as Nvidia Data Center GPUs
- Type: General purpose graphics cards

Nvidia Tesla is the former name for a line of products developed by Nvidia targeted at stream processing or general-purpose graphics processing units (GPGPU), named after pioneering electrical engineer Nikola Tesla. Its products began using GPUs from the G80 series, and have continued to accompany the release of new chips. They are programmable using the CUDA or OpenCL APIs.

The Nvidia Tesla product line competed with AMD's Radeon Instinct and Intel Xeon Phi lines of deep learning and GPU cards.

Nvidia retired the Tesla brand in May 2020, reportedly because of potential confusion with the brand of cars. Its new GPUs are branded Nvidia Data Center GPUs as in the Ampere-based A100 GPU.

Nvidia DGX servers feature Nvidia GPGPUs.

== Overview ==
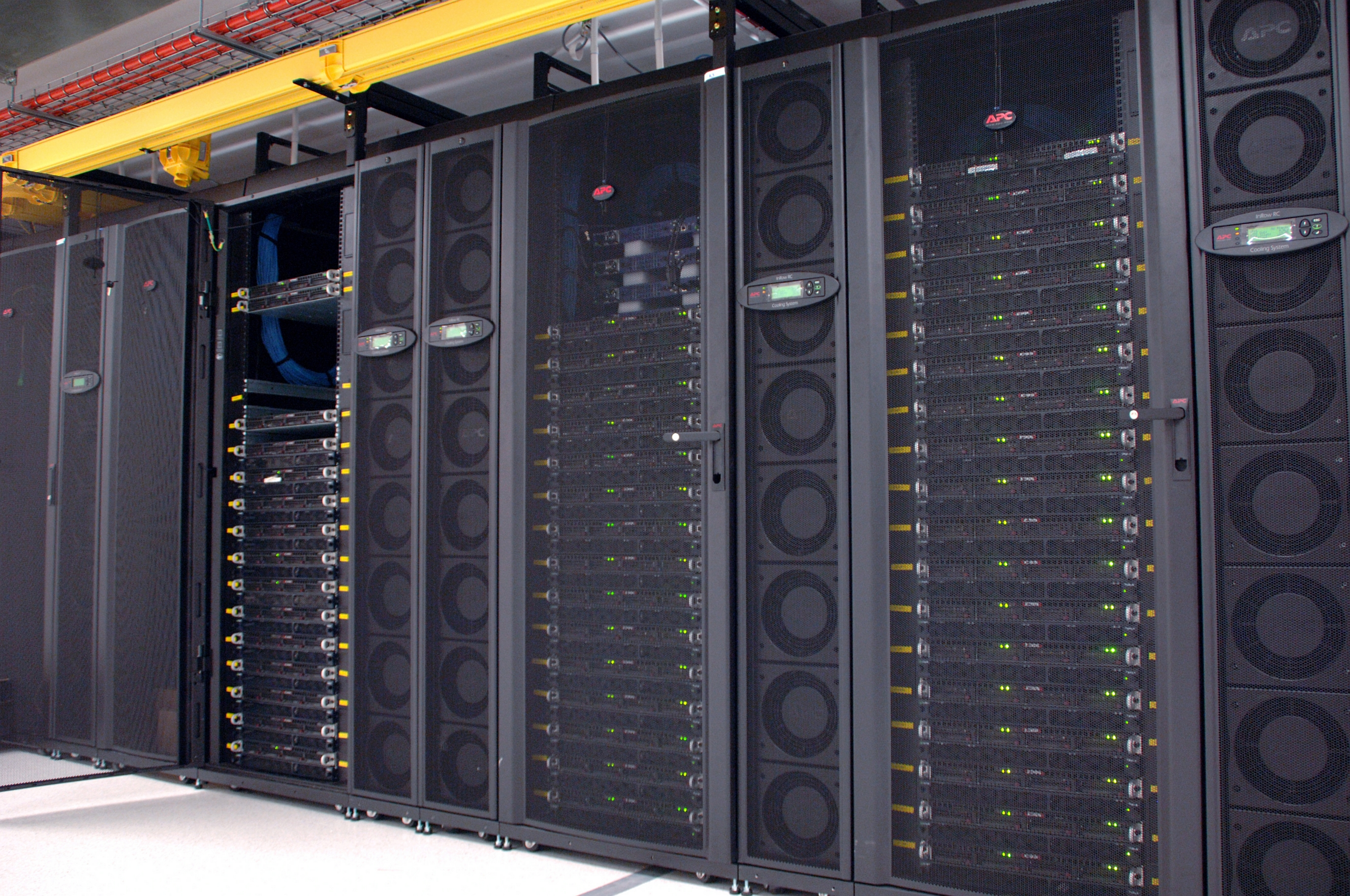
CSIRO data-center GPU cluster utilizing Tesla S1070

Offering computational power much greater than traditional microprocessors, the Tesla products targeted the high-performance computing market. As of 2012, Nvidia Teslas power some of the world's fastest supercomputers, including Summit at Oak Ridge National Laboratory and Tianhe-1A, in Tianjin, China.

Unlike Nvidia's consumer GeForce cards and professional Nvidia Quadro cards, Tesla cards were originally unable to output images to a display. However, the last Tesla C-class products included one Dual-Link DVI port.

== Applications ==
Tesla products are primarily used in simulations and in large-scale calculations (especially floating-point calculations), and for high-end image generation for professional and scientific fields.

In 2013, the defense industry accounted for less than one-sixth of Tesla sales, but Sumit Gupta predicted increasing sales to the geospatial intelligence market.

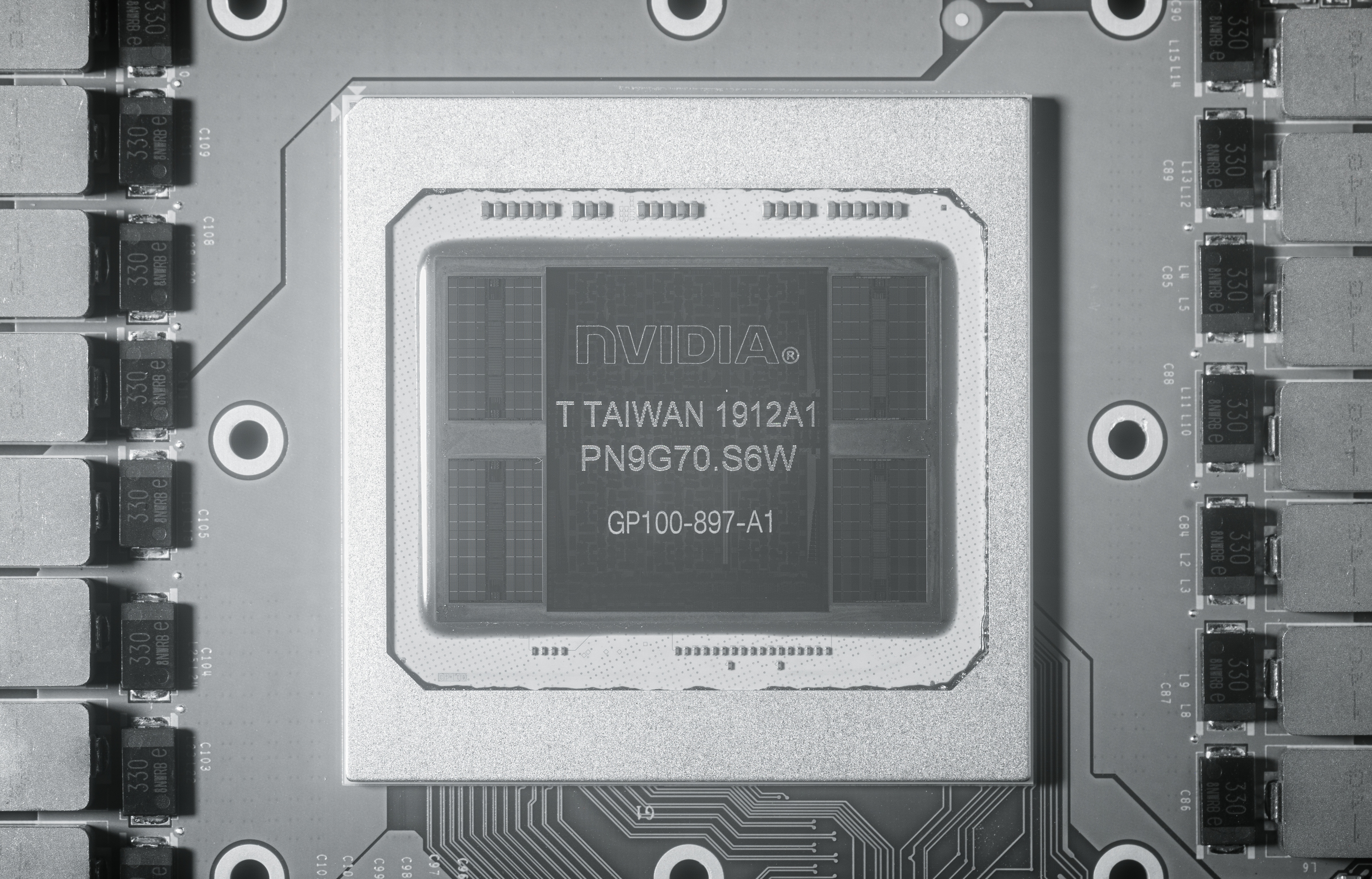
Nvidia Tesla P100 die

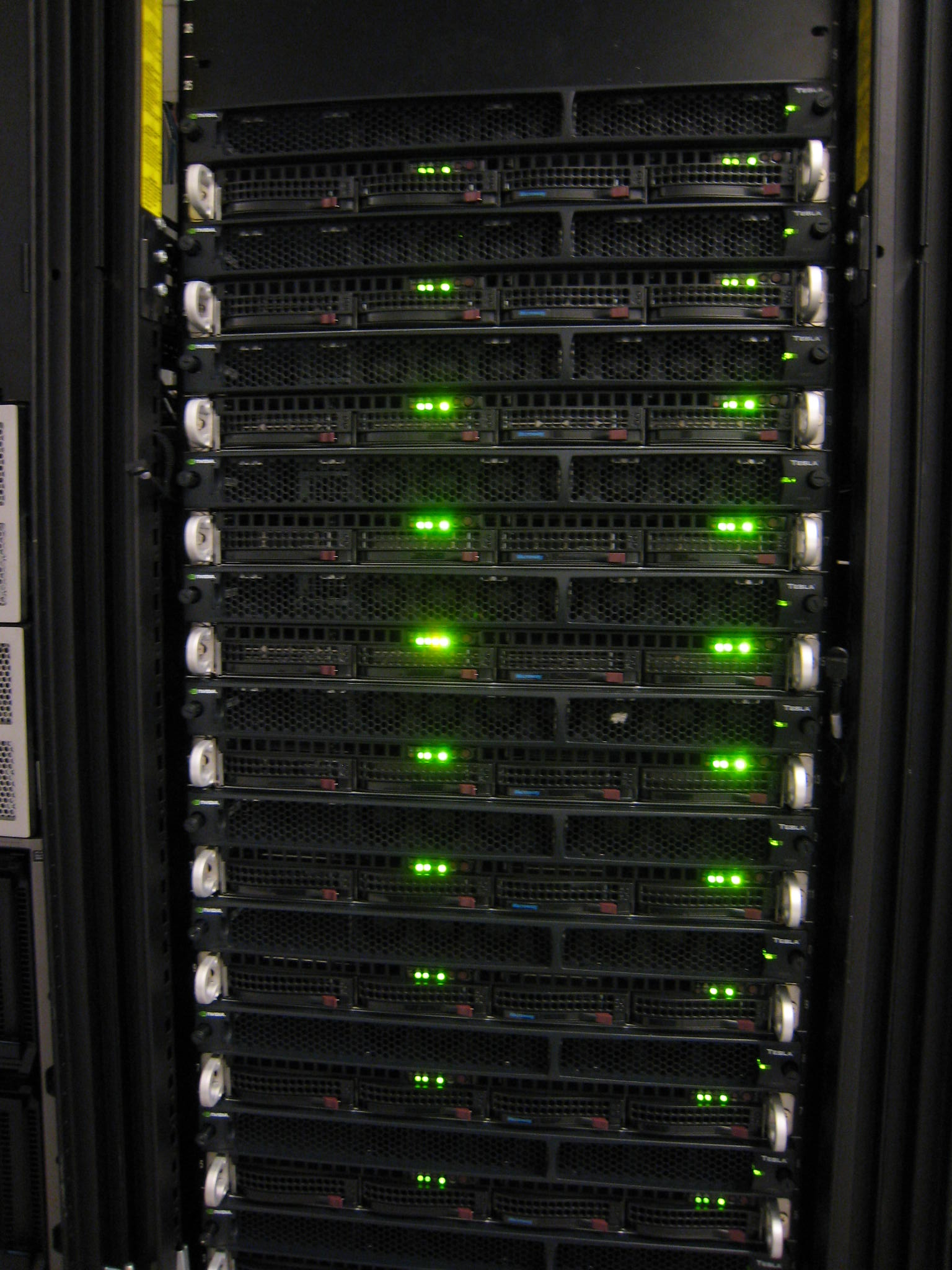
Servers utilizing an Nvidia Tesla GPU cluster

== Specifications ==
Model	Microarchitecture	Launch	Core	Core clock (MHz)	Shaders			Memory					Processing power (TFLOPS) (Note: To calculate the processing power see Tesla (microarchitecture)#Performance, Fermi (microarchitecture)#Performance, Kepler (microarchitecture)#Performance, Maxwell (microarchitecture)#Performance, or Pascal (microarchitecture)#Performance. A number range specifies the minimum and maximum processing power at, respectively, the base clock and maximum boost clock.)			CUDA compute capability (Note: Core architecture version according to the CUDA programming guide.)	TDP (W)	Notes, form factor
Model	Microarchitecture	Launch	Core	Core clock (MHz)	Core config (Note: Main shader processors : texture mapping unit : render output units : tensor cores : ray-tracing cores (streaming multiprocessors))	Base clock (MHz)	Max boost clock (MHz) (Note: GPU Boost is a default feature that increases the core clock rate while remaining under the card's predetermined power budget. Multiple boost clocks are available, but this table lists the highest clock supported by each card.)	Bus type	Bus width (bit)	Size (GB)	Clock (MT/s)	Bandwidth (GB/s)	Half precision Tensor Core FP32 Accumulate	Single precision (MAD or FMA)	Double precision (FMA)	CUDA compute capability	TDP (W)	Notes, form factor
C870 GPU Computing Module (Note: Specifications not specified by Nvidia assumed to be based on the GeForce 8800 GTX)	Tesla	May 2, 2007	1× G80	600	128:32 :24:0:0 (16)	1350	—N/a	GDDR3	384	1.5	1600	76.8	No	0.3456	No	1.0	170.9	Internal PCIe GPU (full-height, dual-slot)
D870 Deskside Computer	Tesla	May 2, 2007	2× G80	600	2× 128:32 :24:0:0 (16)	1350	—N/a	GDDR3	2× 384	2× 1.5	1600	2× 76.8	No	0.6912	No	1.0	520	Deskside or 3U rack-mount external GPUs
S870 GPU Computing Server	Tesla	May 2, 2007	4× G80	600	4× 128:32 :24:0:0 (16)	1350	—N/a	GDDR3	4× 384	4× 1.5	1600	4× 76.8	No	1.382	No	1.0		1U rack-mount external GPUs, connect via 2× PCIe (×16)
C1060 GPU Computing Module (Note: Specifications not specified by Nvidia assumed to be based on the GeForce GTX 280)	Tesla	April 9, 2009	1× GT200	602	240:80 :32:0:0 (30)	1296	—N/a	GDDR3	512	4	1600	102.4	No	0.6221	0.07776	1.3	187.8	Internal PCIe GPU (full-height, dual-slot)
S1070 GPU Computing Server "400 configuration"	Tesla	June 1, 2008	4× GT200	602	4× 240:80 :32:0:0 (30)	1296	—N/a	GDDR3	4× 512	4× 4	1538.4	4× 98.5	No	2.488	0.311	1.3	800	1U rack-mount external GPUs, connect via 2× PCIe (×8 or ×16)
S1070 GPU Computing Server "500 configuration"	Tesla	June 1, 2008	4× GT200	602	4× 240:80 :32:0:0 (30)	1440	—N/a	GDDR3	4× 512	4× 4	1538.4	4× 98.5	No	2.765	0.3456	1.3	800	1U rack-mount external GPUs, connect via 2× PCIe (×8 or ×16)
S1075 GPU Computing Server	Tesla	June 1, 2008	4× GT200	602	4× 240:80 :32:0:0 (30)	1440	—N/a	GDDR3	4× 512	4× 4	1538	4× 98.5	No	2.765	0.3456	1.3		1U rack-mount external GPUs, connect via 1× PCIe (×8 or ×16)
Quadro Plex 2200 D2 Visual Computing System (Note: Specifications not specified by Nvidia assumed to be based on the Quadro FX 5800)	Tesla	July 25, 2008	2× GT200GL	648	2× 240:80 :32:0:0 (30)	1296	—N/a	GDDR3	2× 512	2× 4	1600	2× 102.4	No	1.244	0.1555	1.3		Deskside or 3U rack-mount external GPUs with 4 dual-link DVI outputs
Quadro Plex 2200 S4 Visual Computing System	Tesla	July 25, 2008	4× GT200GL	648	4× 240:80 :32:0:0 (30)	1296	—N/a	GDDR3	4× 512	4× 4	1600	4× 102.4	No	2.488	0.311	1.3	1200	1U rack-mount external GPUs, connect via 2× PCIe (×8 or ×16)
C2050 GPU Computing Module	Fermi	July 25, 2011	1× GF100	575	448:56 :48:0:0 (14)	1150	—N/a	GDDR5	384	3 (Note: With ECC on, a portion of the dedicated memory is used for ECC bits, so the available user memory is reduced by 12.5%. (e.g. 4 GB total memory yields 3.5 GB of user available memory.))	3000	144	No	1.030	0.5152	2.0	247	Internal PCIe GPU (full-height, dual-slot)
M2050 GPU Computing Module	Fermi	July 25, 2011	1× GF100	575	448:56 :48:0:0 (14)	1150	—N/a	GDDR5	384	3	3092	148.4	No	1.030	0.5152	2.0	225	Internal PCIe GPU (full-height, dual-slot)
C2070 GPU Computing Module	Fermi	July 25, 2011	1× GF100	575	448:56 :48:0:0 (14)	1150	—N/a	GDDR5	384	6	3000	144	No	1.030	0.5152	2.0	247	Internal PCIe GPU (full-height, dual-slot)
C2075 GPU Computing Module	Fermi	July 25, 2011	1× GF100	575	448:56 :48:0:0 (14)	1150	—N/a	GDDR5	384	6	3000	144	No	1.030	0.5152	2.0	225	Internal PCIe GPU (full-height, dual-slot)
M2070/M2070Q GPU Computing Module	Fermi	July 25, 2011	1× GF100	575	448:56 :48:0:0 (14)	1150	—N/a	GDDR5	384	6	3132	150.3	No	1.030	0.5152	2.0	225	Internal PCIe GPU (full-height, dual-slot)
M2090 GPU Computing Module	Fermi	July 25, 2011	1× GF110	650	512:64 :48:0:0 (16)	1300	—N/a	GDDR5	384	6	3700	177.6	No	1.331	0.6656	2.0	225	Internal PCIe GPU (full-height, dual-slot)
S2050 GPU Computing Server	Fermi	July 25, 2011	4× GF100	575	4× 448:56 :48:0:0 (14)	1150	—N/a	GDDR5	4× 384	4× 3	3000	4× 148.4	No	4.122	2.061	2.0	900	1U rack-mount external GPUs, connect via 2× PCIe (×8 or ×16)
S2070 GPU Computing Server	Fermi	July 25, 2011	4× GF100	575	4× 448:56 :48:0:0 (14)	1150	—N/a	GDDR5	4× 384	4× 6	3000	4× 148.4	No	4.122	2.061	2.0	900	1U rack-mount external GPUs, connect via 2× PCIe (×8 or ×16)
K10 GPU accelerator	Kepler	May 1, 2012	2× GK104	—N/a	2× 1536:138 :32:0:0 (8)	745	?	GDDR5	2× 256	2× 4	5000	2× 160	No	4.577	0.1907	3.0	225	Internal PCIe GPU (full-height, dual-slot)
K20 GPU accelerator	Kepler	November 12, 2012	1× GK110	—N/a	2496:208 :40:0:0 (13)	706	758	GDDR5	320	5	5200	208	No	3.524	1.175	3.5	225	Internal PCIe GPU (full-height, dual-slot)
K20X GPU accelerator	Kepler	November 12, 2012	1× GK110	—N/a	2688:224 :48:0:0 (14)	732	?	GDDR5	384	6	5200	250	No	3.935	1.312	3.5	235	Internal PCIe GPU (full-height, dual-slot)
K40 GPU accelerator	Kepler	October 8, 2013	1× GK110B	—N/a	2880:240 :48:0:0 (15)	745	875	GDDR5	384	12	6000	288	No	4.291–5.040	1.430–1.680	3.5	235	Internal PCIe GPU (full-height, dual-slot)
K80 GPU accelerator	Kepler	November 17, 2014	2× GK210	—N/a	2× 2496:208 :48:0:0 (13)	560	875	GDDR5	2× 384	2× 12	5000	2× 240	No	5.591–8.736	1.864–2.912	3.7	300	Internal PCIe GPU (full-height, dual-slot)
M4 GPU accelerator	Maxwell	November 10, 2015	1× GM206	—N/a	1024:64 :32:0:0 (8)	872	1072	GDDR5	128	4	5500	88	No	1.786–2.195	0.05581–0.06861	5.2	50–75	Internal PCIe GPU (half-height, single-slot)
M6 GPU accelerator	Maxwell	August 30, 2015	1× GM204-995-A1	—N/a	1536:96 :64:0:0 (12)	722	1051	GDDR5	256	8	4600	147.2	No	2.218–3.229	0.0693–0.1009	5.2	75–100	Internal MXM GPU
M10 GPU accelerator	Maxwell	May 18, 2016	4× GM107	—N/a	4× 640:40 :16:0:0 (5)	1033	?	GDDR5	4× 128	4× 8	5188	4× 83	No	5.289	0.1653	5.2	225	Internal PCIe GPU (full-height, dual-slot)
M40 GPU accelerator	Maxwell	November 10, 2015	1× GM200	—N/a	3072:192 :96:0:0 (24)	948	1114	GDDR5	384	12 or 24	6000	288	No	5.825–6.844	0.182–0.2139	5.2	250	Internal PCIe GPU (full-height, dual-slot)
M60 GPU accelerator	Maxwell	August 30, 2015	2× GM204-895-A1	—N/a	2× 2048:128 :64:0:0 (16)	899	1178	GDDR5	2× 256	2× 8	5000	2× 160	No	7.365–9.650	0.2301–0.3016	5.2	225–300	Internal PCIe GPU (full-height, dual-slot)
P4 GPU accelerator	Pascal	September 13, 2016	1× GP104	—N/a	2560:160 :64:0:0 (20)	810	1063	GDDR5	256	8	6000	192.0	No	4.147–5.443	0.1296–0.1701	6.1	50–75	PCIe card
P6 GPU accelerator	Pascal	March 24, 2017	1× GP104-995-A1	—N/a	2048:128 :64:0:0 (16)	1012	1506	GDDR5	256	16	3003	192.2	No	6.169	0.1928	6.1	90	MXM card
P40 GPU accelerator	Pascal	September 13, 2016	1× GP102	—N/a	3840:240 :96:0:0 (30)	1303	1531	GDDR5	384	24	7200	345.6	No	10.01–11.76	0.3127–0.3674	6.1	250	PCIe card
P100 GPU accelerator (mezzanine)	Pascal	April 5, 2016	1× GP100-890-A1	—N/a	3584:224 :96:0:0 (56)	1328	1480	HBM2	4096	16	1430	732	No	9.519–10.61	4.760–5.304	6.0	300	SXM card
P100 GPU accelerator (16 GB card)	Pascal	June 20, 2016	1× GP100	—N/a	3584:224 :96:0:0 (56)	1126	1303	HBM2	4096	16	1430	732	No	8.071‒9.340	4.036‒4.670	6.0	250	PCIe card
P100 GPU accelerator (12 GB card)	Pascal	June 20, 2016	1× GP100	—N/a	3584:224 :96:0:0 (56)	1126	1303	HBM2	3072	12	1430	549	No	8.071‒9.340	4.036‒4.670	6.0	250	PCIe card
V100 GPU accelerator (mezzanine)	Volta	May 10, 2017	1× GV100-895-A1	—N/a	5120:320 :128:640:0 (80)	Unknown	1455	HBM2	4096	16 or 32	1750	900	119.2	14.90	7.450	7.0	300	SXM card
V100 GPU accelerator (PCIe card)	Volta	June 21, 2017	1× GV100	—N/a	5120:320 :128:640:0 (80)	Unknown	1370	HBM2	4096	16 or 32	1750	900	112.2	14.03	7.014	7.0	250	PCIe card
V100 GPU accelerator (PCIe FHHL card)	Volta	March 27, 2018	1× GV100	—N/a	5120:320 :128:640:0 (80)	937	1290	HBM2	4096	16	1620	829.4	105.7	13.21	6.605	7.0	250	PCIe FHHL card
T4 GPU accelerator (PCIe card)	Turing	September 12, 2018	1× TU104-895-A1	—N/a	2560:160 :64:320:40 (40)	585	1590	GDDR6	256	16	5000	320	64.8	8.1	Unknown	7.5	70	PCIe card
A2 GPU accelerator (PCIe card)	Ampere	November 10, 2021	1× GA107	—N/a	1280:40 :32:40:10 (10)	1440	1770	GDDR6	128	16	6252	200	18.12	4.531	0.14	8.6	40–60	PCIe card (half height, single-slot)
A10 GPU accelerator (PCIe card)	Ampere	April 12, 2021	1× GA102-890-A1	—N/a	9216:288 :96:288:72 (72)	885	1695	GDDR6	384	24	6252	600	125.0	31.24	0.976	8.6	150	PCIe card (single-slot)
A16 GPU accelerator (PCIe card)	Ampere	April 12, 2021	4× GA107	—N/a	4× 1280:40 :32:40:10 (10)	885	1695	GDDR6	4× 128	4× 16	7242	4× 200	4x 18.43	4× 4.608	1.085	8.6	250	PCIe card (dual-slot)
A30 GPU accelerator (PCIe card)	Ampere	April 12, 2021	1× GA100	—N/a	3584:224 :96:224:0 (56)	930	1440	HBM2	3072	24	1215	933.1	165.1	10.32	5.161	8.0	165	PCIe card (dual-slot)
A40 GPU accelerator (PCIe card)	Ampere	October 5, 2020	1× GA102	—N/a	10752:336 :112:336:84 (84)	1305	1740	GDDR6	384	48	7248	695.8	149.7	37.42	1.168	8.6	300	PCIe card (dual-slot)
A100 GPU accelerator (PCIe card)	Ampere	May 14, 2020	1× GA100-883AA-A1	—N/a	6912:432 :160:432:0 (108)	765	1410	HBM2	5120	40 or 80	1215	1555	312.0	19.5	9.7	8.0	250	PCIe card (dual-slot)
H100 GPU accelerator (PCIe card)	Hopper	March 22, 2022	1× GH100	—N/a	14592:456 :24:456:0 (114)	1065	1755 CUDA 1620 TC	HBM2E	5120	80	1000	2039	756.4	51.2	25.6	9.0	350	PCIe card (dual-slot)
H100 GPU accelerator (SXM card)	Hopper	March 22, 2022	1× GH100	—N/a	16896:528 :24:528:0 (132)	1065	1980 CUDA 1830 TC	HBM3	5120	64 or 80 or 96	1500	3352	989.4	66.9	33.5	9.0	700	SXM card
H200 GPU accelerator (PCIe card)	Hopper	November 18, 2024	1× GH100	—N/a	16896:528 :24:528:0 (132)	1365	1785	HBM3E	5120	141	1313	3360	835	60.32	30.16	9.0	600	PCIe card (dual-slot)
H200 GPU accelerator (SXM card)	Hopper	November 18, 2024	1× GH100	—N/a	16896:528 :24:528:0 (132)	1590	1980	HBM3E	5120	141	1313	3360	989	66.91	33.45	9.0	700	SXM card
H800 GPU accelerator (SXM card)	Hopper	March 21, 2023	1× GH100	—N/a	16896:528 :24:528:0 (132)	1095	1755	HBM3	5120	80	1313	3360	—N/a	59.3	29.65	9.0	700	SXM card
L40 GPU accelerator	Ada Lovelace	October 13, 2022	1× AD102	—N/a	18176:568 :192:568:142 (142)	735	2490	GDDR6	384	48	2250	864	362.1	90.52	1.414	8.9	300	PCIe card (dual-slot)
L4 GPU accelerator	Ada Lovelace	March 21, 2023	1x AD104	—N/a	7424:240 :80:240:0 (60)	795	2040	GDDR6	192	24	1563	300	121.0	30.3	0.49	8.9	72	HHHL single slot PCIe card
B100 GPU accelerator	Blackwell	Never Released	2× GB102	—N/a	16896:528 :24:528:0 (132)	700	975	HBM3E	8192	192	2000	8000	131.8	32.95	16.47	10.1	1000	SXM card
B200 GPU accelerator	Blackwell	November 2024	2× GB100	—N/a	18944:592 :24:592:0 (148)	700	1965 CUDA 1830 TC	HBM3E	8192	180	2000	8000	1191.2	74.45	37.22	10.0	1000	SXM card
B300 GPU accelerator	Blackwell	Sep 11, 2025	2× GB110	—N/a	18944:592 :24:592:0 (148)	1665	2032	HBM3E	8192	288	2000	8000	1231.8	76.99	1.2029	10.3	1400	SXM card

== See also ==
- Fastra II
- List of Nvidia graphics processing units
- Nvidia Tesla Personal Supercomputer
