= Kraken (supercomputer) =

Supercomputer (operative 2009–2014)

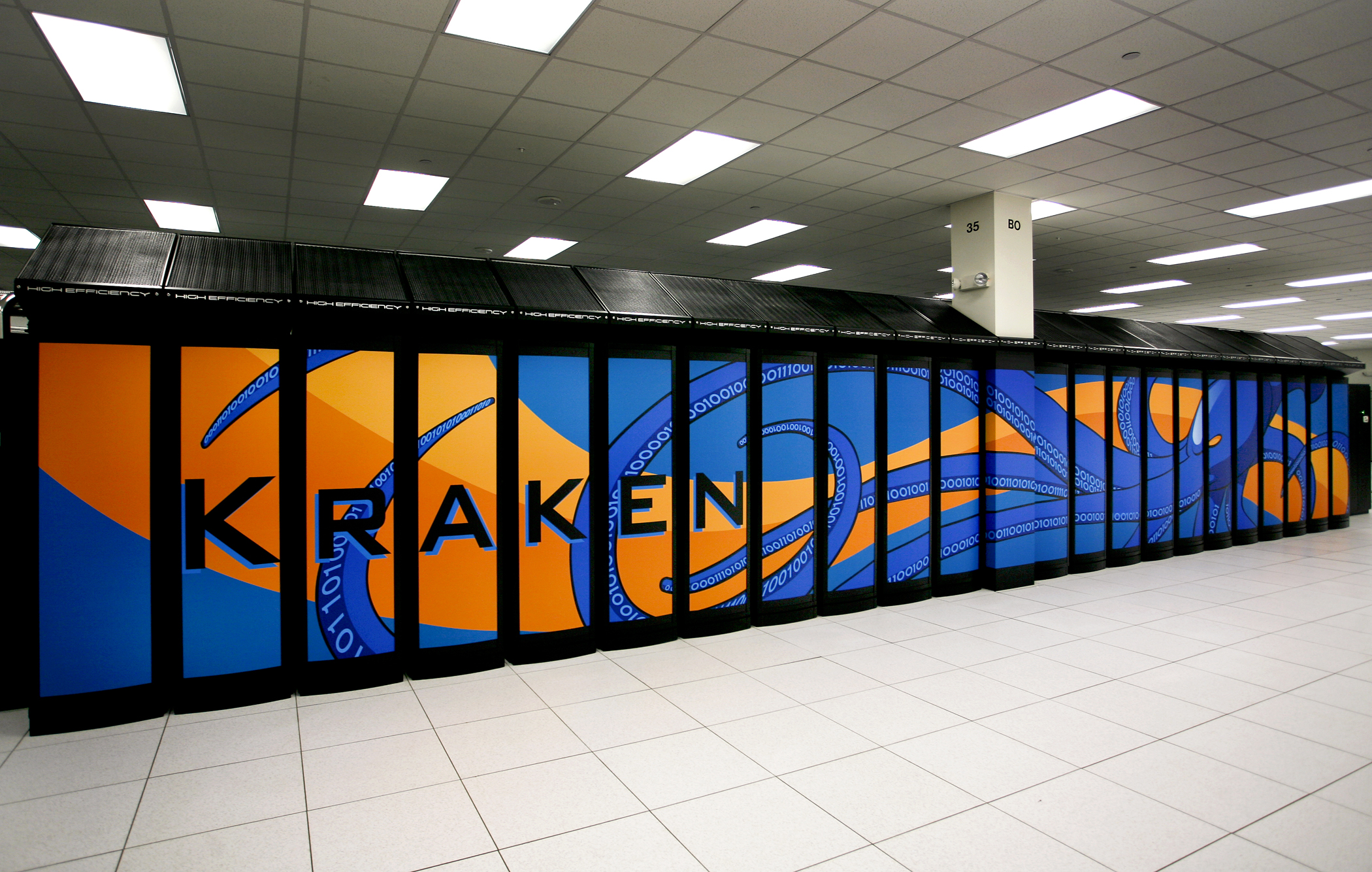
- Active: Entered production February 2009; decommissioned April 2014
- Sponsors: National Science Foundation
- Operators: National Institute for Computational Sciences, University of Tennessee
- Location: Oak Ridge National Laboratory
- Architecture: 9,408 nodes each containing two 2.6 GHz six-core AMD Opteron processors (Istanbul)
- Operating system: Cray Linux Environment (CLE) 3.1
- Storage: 3.3 PB
- Speed: 1.17 petaFLOPS (peak)
- Purpose: Scientific research

Kraken was a Cray XT5 supercomputer that entered into full production mode on February 2, 2009. Kraken was operated by the University of Tennessee and was the most powerful computer in the world managed by academia at the time. It was housed in the Oak Ridge Leadership Computing facility at Oak Ridge National Laboratory. Kraken was decommissioned on April 30, 2014.

== History ==
Kraken's history began in 1991 with the establishment of the Joint Institute for Computational Sciences (JICS), a joint venture between the University of Tennessee and Oak Ridge National Laboratory. The JICS facility, the UT campus building in which JICS is housed, is one of the only state-owned buildings ever built on the campus of a national laboratory. The main goals of JICS are to create new ways to simulate and model data using supercomputers and to train future engineers and scientists on the use of these techniques.

The next major event in the establishment of Kraken occurred in the Spring of 2008 when the National Science Foundation awarded the University of Tennessee a $65 million grant to build and operate a supercomputer in order to aid public research in academia; the grant provided $30 million for the hardware and $35 million for the operation of the system. The supercomputer was housed at Oak Ridge Leadership Computing Facility and managed by the University of Tennessee's National Institute for Computational Sciences (NICS).

Kraken entered full production on February 2, 2009 with a speed of 607 TeraFLOPs, or 607 trillion calculations per second. In late 2009 Kraken became only the fourth supercomputer ever to perform at a petaFLOP, 1,000 trillion calculations per second, and attained its highest position on the list of the world’s most powerful supercomputers at 3rd place. Kraken was also the most powerful supercomputer operated by a public university. In late 2010 Kraken had fallen to the 8th place on the list of most powerful supercomputers but was still the most powerful supercomputer operated by academia.

Kraken was taken offline and retired on April 30, 2014.

== Hardware/Software ==
Kraken's hardware occupied 2,200 square feet (200 m^{2}) in January 2011. It ran the Cray Linux Environment, a range of UNIX like operating system variants developed by Cray specifically for supercomputers, with a peak performance of 1.17 petaFLOPs. Kraken contained 112,896 computing cores (18,816 2.6 GHz six-core AMD Opteron processors) having 147 TB of memory. It had a 2.4-PB raw parallel file system of disk storage. The compute system was made up of 9,408 compute nodes, each having two 2.6-GHz hex-core AMD Opteron processors, 16 GB of memory and connections via Cray's SeaStar2+ router.

== Notes and references ==
- "Kraken". The National Institute for Computational Sciences. Retrieved 28 July 2014.
- "Frank Munger": Old supercomputers may go to universities. 20 April 2011. Knox News. Retrieved 23 May 2011.
- "Kraken User Guide". The National Institute for Computational Sciences. 22 May 2011.
- "UT's Kraken Supercomputer Named World's Sixth Fastest". 24 Jun 2009. The National Institute for Computational Sciences. Retrieved 22 May 2011.
- "UT's Kraken Supercomputer First Academic Computer to Break Petascale". 6 Oct 2009. HPCwire. Retrieved 22 May 2011.
