= Peloton (disambiguation) =

A peloton is the main group of riders in a bicycle road race.

Peloton may also refer to:

- Peloton (album), by Delgados
- Peloton (supercomputer), a program at the Lawrence Livermore National Laboratory
- Peloton Interactive, an exercise equipment company
- Peloton Technology, a connected vehicle technology company
- Peloton, the intracellular portion of an Orchid mycorrhiza
