= NASA Research and Engineering Network =

US nationwide wide area network

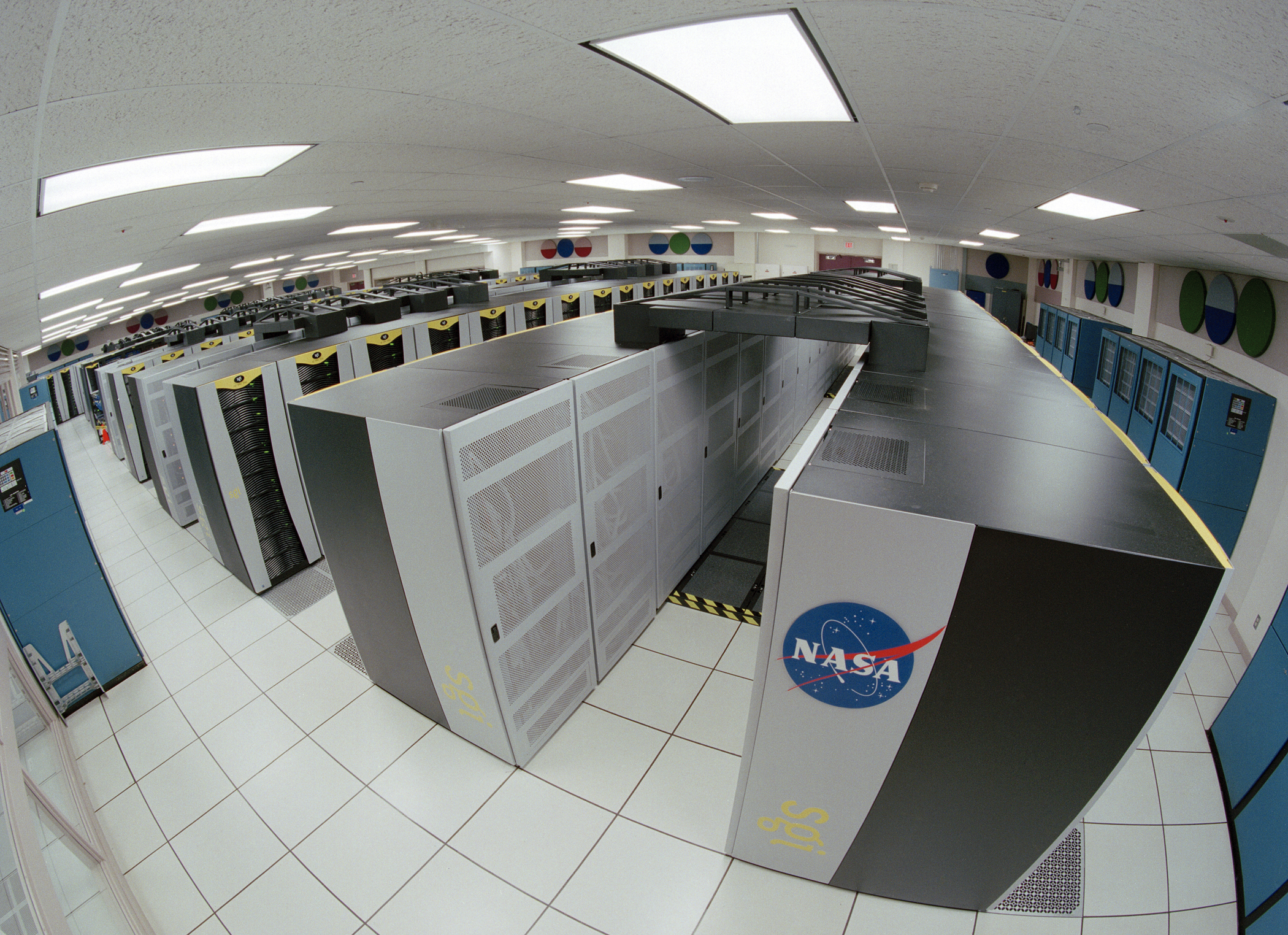
The Columbia Supercomputer at the NASA Advanced Supercomputing Facility.

The NASA Research and Engineering Network (NREN) is a nationwide wide area network which connects selected NASA centers and peers with other high-performance network test-beds. It enables NASA scientists, engineers, and researchers to reach their partners within other federal agencies and academia.

The NREN was initially developed in 1996 enabling:

- Aerospace engineers to revolutionize air travel by remotely controlling wind tunnels on their desktops,
- astronauts and engineers to train together in realistic simulations of space flight,
- medical researchers to safely monitor and treat humans in space from the Earth,
- Earth scientists from all over the country to develop climate models that allow us to predict and respond to environmental events such as floods, and
- space scientists to chart the evolution of the universe.

NASA led the creation of the Next Generation Internet - as the lead organizer of the NGI Implementation Plan NREN pioneered three initial NGI Exchanges (NGIXs) with its interagency partners.

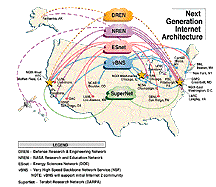
NREN interconnected to the Next Generation Internet at the "NGI eXchanges" --NGIXs-- to expand research community participation and address networking scaling.

Since its creation NREN has been upgraded several times. It currently has 10 Gigabits-per-second (Gbit/s) connectivity across the continental United States, primarily to link to the Columbia supercomputer at the NASA Ames Research Center in Moffett Field, California.

In March 2006, NREN developed and implemented a custom wireless networking protocol known as Dynamic Source Routing (DSR). DSR was to be used by field teams and robots to facilitate communication in difficult field conditions.

In September 2006 the NREN was used to develop a high transfer rate application called BBFTP to support GOES 5 operations between Ames and Goddard Space Flight Center (GSFC). BBFTP achieved transfer rates as high as 52 Megabytes/sec, and a net transfer of well over 4 terabytes worth of data.

The NREN supported operations of the McGill High Arctic Research Station (MARS).

== See also ==
- Defense Research and Engineering Network
