= National Institute for Computational Sciences =

Institute at the University of Tennessee

Coordinates: 35.93105°N 84.31014°W

The National Institute for Computational Sciences (NICS) is funded by the National Science Foundation and managed by the University of Tennessee. NICS was home to Kraken, the most powerful computer in the world managed by academia. The NICS petascale scientific computing environment is housed at Oak Ridge National Laboratory (ORNL), home to the world's most powerful computing complex. The mission of NICS, a member of the Extreme Science and Engineering Discovery Environment (XSEDE - formerly TeraGrid), is to enable the scientific discoveries of researchers nationwide by providing leading-edge computational resources, together with support for their effective use, and leveraging extensive partnership opportunities.

== Systems ==
=== Kraken ===
Kraken was the University of Tennessee's petascale computing environment funded by the NSF and fully integrated with XSEDE formerly TeraGrid XD. Kraken was a 1.17-petaflop Cray XT5 system containing 18,816 compute sockets and more than 147 terabytes of memory. In November 2009, it was named the third fastest computer in the world. In its final configuration, the XT5 system delivered in excess of 700 million CPU hours per year. The system was designed specifically for sustained application performance, scalability, reliability and incorporated key elements of the Cray Cascade system. Kraken provided the user community a sustained, high-productivity petascale resource for science and engineering applications. The NSF computer system was co-located with the National Center for Computational Sciences, home of Titan, and other major user facilities at the ORNL campus.

=== Nautilus ===
Nautilus is an SGI Altix UV 1000 and the heart of RDAV, the University of Tennessee's Center for Remote Data Analysis and Visualization sponsored by the National Science Foundation as part of XSEDE, formerly TeraGrid XD. Scientists and engineers are daily producing terabytes of digital data through experimentation, observation and simulation. RDAV's purpose is to aid in the significant challenge of transforming this data into knowledge and insight by providing remote visualization, analysis, and scientific workflow technologies. Nautilus has 1024 cores and 4 terabytes of global shared memory.

=== Keeneland ===
NICS operates the Keeneland Initial Delivery system for Georgia Tech. It is composed of an HP SL-390 (Ariston) cluster with Intel Westmere hex-core CPUs, NVIDIA 6GB Fermi GPUs, and a Qlogic QDR InfiniBand interconnect. Each node has two hex-core CPUs and 3 GPUs, with a total of 120 nodes, 240 CPUs and 360 GPUs.

=== Verne ===
Verne a 5-node cluster of Dell R505 quad-socket/quad-core Opteron servers dedicated to data analysis and high-end visualization was retired in September 2010. Each node contained 16 processor cores, 128 gigabytes of memory, and 4 terabytes of local disk space. The primary purpose of Verne was to enable data analysis and visualization of simulation data generated on Kraken.

=== HPSS ===
The mass storage facility at ORNL currently consists of tape and disk storage components, IBM servers, Linux servers, and High Performance Storage System (HPSS) software. As of January 2009 it stored over 4 petabytes of data in over 11.5 million files.

Tape storage is provided by robotic tape libraries. The StorageTek SL8500 libraries can each hold up to 10,000 cartridges and together house a total of thirteen 9840 drives (20 gigabyte cartridges, uncompressed), sixteen 9940B drives (200 gigabyte cartridges, uncompressed), thirty-two T10000A drives (500 gigabyte cartridges, uncompressed), and sixteen T10000B drives (1,000 gigabyte cartridges, uncompressed). The 9840 and 9940A drives read and write uncompressed data at 10 megabytes per second; the 9940B reads and writes at 30 megabytes per second. The beneficial feature of the 9840 tape technology is its fast seek time for small file access; the T10000 tape technology provides the ability to store a larger amount of data on each tape cartridge for more voluminous data sets.

== Research areas ==
The research areas explored on Kraken include:

- Astrophysics – Understanding the mechanism behind supernova explosions.
- Biology – Finding a more efficient way to convert cellulose to ethanol.
- Climate – Enhancing resolution in the climate models used by policymakers.
- Seismology – Finding out where in California the ground would be most susceptible to movement in future earthquakes.
- Physics – Revealing the nature of matter from the behavior of molecules to the atoms that make up those molecules, to quarks, electrons, and other fundamental particles.
