= High Performance Computing Modernization Program =

- Abbreviation: HPCMP
- Formation: 1992; 34 years ago
- Headquarters: Vicksburg, MS
- Director: Kelly Dalton
- Parent organization: ERDC
- Website: www.hpc.mil
- ASN: 668

The United States Department of Defense High Performance Computing Modernization Program (HPCMP) was initiated in 1992 in response to Congressional direction to modernize the Department of Defense (DoD) laboratories’ high performance computing capabilities. The HPCMP provides supercomputers, a national research network, high-end software tools, a secure environment, and computational science experts that together enable the Defense laboratories and test centers to conduct research, development, test and technology evaluation activities.

The program was administered by the Office of the Director, Defense Research and Engineering (now called the Assistant Secretary of Defense for Research and Engineering) through FY2011, at which point it was transferred to the office of the United States Assistant Secretary of the Army for Acquisition, Logistics, and Technology, where it is managed by the Deputy Assistant Secretary for Research and Technology.

The program comprises three primary elements: DoD Supercomputing Resource Centers (DSRCs), which provide large scale supercomputers and operations staff; Defense Research and Engineering Network (DREN), a nationwide high speed, low latency, R&D network connecting the centers and major user communities; and a collection of efforts in software applications to develop, modernize, and maintain software to address DoD's science and engineering challenges. Mr. Kelly Dalton is the current Director of HPCMP.

== DoD Supercomputing Resource Centers ==
The HPCMP funds and oversees the operation of five supercomputing centers, called DoD Supercomputing Resource Centers (DSRCs). The centers are operated by the Engineer Research and Development Center in Vicksburg, MS, the Army Research Laboratory in Aberdeen, MD, the Naval Meteorology and Oceanography Command in Stennis Space Center, MS, the Air Force Research Laboratory in Dayton, OH, and the Maui High Performance Computing Center in Maui, HI. The Arctic Region Supercomputing Center in Fairbanks, AK, was a sixth DSRC until funding was discontinued in 2011.

Each center hosts large-scale supercomputers, high-speed networks, multi-petabyte archival mass storage systems, and computational experts. The centers are managed by the HPCMP Assistant Director for Centers, who also funds program-wide activities in user support (the HPC Help Desk) and scientific visualization (the Data Analysis and Assessment Center).

== Defense Research and Engineering Network ==
The Defense Research and Engineering Network (DREN) — a high-speed national computer network for US Department of Defense (DoD) computational research, engineering, and testing — is a significant component of the DoD High Performance Computing Modernization Program (HPCMP).

DREN is DoD's premier wide area network (WAN) for research, test and engineering missions. DREN is a high-speed, high-capacity, low-latency, low-jitter nationwide computer network in support of the DoD's High Performance Computing, Science and Technology, Test and Evaluation and Acquisition Engineering communities. DREN connects scientists and engineers with the HPCMP's geographically dispersed high performance computing (HPC) sites, including the five DoD Supercomputing Resource Centers (DSRCs). DREN is installed at more than 210 DoD sites including research laboratories, test centers, universities, and industrial locations throughout the United States (including Hawaii and Alaska).

The fourth generation DREN network (DREN 4) is provided under a commercial services contract awarded to Verizon in 2021. DREN has been awarded in the past to Lumen (DREN 3), Verizon (DREN 2), and AT&T (DREN 1). DREN service providers typically build DREN as a virtual private network overlay on their commercial network infrastructure. Capabilities provided by DREN 4 include digital data transfer speeds ranging from 1 Gbit/s through 100 Gbit/s. DREN 4 is an IPv6 network, with support for legacy IPv4. The HPCMP is currently in the process of building out DREN 4 which will ultimately replace DREN 3 when fully tested in 2022. The two networks will run in parallel for about one year while the 210 sites are transitioned from DREN 3 to DREN 4.

In 2003, DREN was designated the Department of Defense's first IPv6 network by the Assistant Secretary of Defense for Networks & Information Integration. Since that time, DREN has been a pioneer within the DoD and US Federal Government for IPv6 deployment, running both IPv4/IPv6 dual stack and IPv6-only networks. DREN provides an extensive IPv6 Knowledge Base containing best practices and lessons learned, available at no charge on the HPCMP website.

Other research networks of interest:

- CANARIE
- DANTE
- Energy Sciences Network
- High Performance Wireless Research and Education Network
- Internet2 Network
- NASA Research and Engineering Network

== Software applications ==
In addition to supercomputers and the national wide area research network, the HPCMP funds software applications that help the DoD achieve its research objectives by ensuring that important DoD applications run effectively on the large-scale supercomputers it deploys.

=== HPC Software Applications Institutes ===
HPC Software Applications Institutes, or HSAIs, are cross-disciplinary projects funded by the HPCMP but executed in the DoD labs. The HSAI program both develops tools to solve important computational problems facing the DoD and build organic HPC expertise within the department.

=== User Productivity Enhancement and Training (PET) ===
The High Performance Computing Modernization Program's (HPCMP) User Productivity Enhancement and Training (PET) program gives users access to computational experts with experience spanning a wide variety of HPC technical areas. The PET Team is available to help HPC users become more productive using HPCMP resources with the goal of expediting milestones and reducing overall costs related to technological development to DoD users.

In addition to internal expertise, the PET Team also provides virtual training on effective usage of software, hardware, networking, data transfer, data storage, and visualization of data. PET facilitates and promotes the transfer of scientific and technical knowledge between HPCMP users and the broader computational communities, including DoD and other federal agencies. Help in specific Technical Thrust Areas (TTAs) provide a wide range of expertise including, but not limited to, new delivery methods, emerging hardware exploration, High Performance Data Analytics (HPDA), debugging software, performance improvement with user codes, scalability issues, and porting of software to emerging hardware.

PET offers three modes of support depending on the type, duration, and level of user support required:

- Mission Projects (MPs): Mission Projects are designed to assist users with solving complex issues in mission-critical areas. MPs will last anywhere from 1 to 12 months in duration. PET Team scientists will advise and assist in developing, applying, and/or using algorithms and in maximizing usage of existing software.
- Special Projects (SPs): Concentrated efforts involving separately funded projects that may include PET Team support staff or other subcontractors for project/user specific challenges.
- Training: Trains the HPC community in applicable tools and technologies using the latest collaboration, distance learning, and training technologies.

=== Computational Research and Engineering Acquisition Tools and Environments ===
CREATE is a federated program approved in the DoD 2006 Program Objective Memorandum (POM) process, with funding starting in 2008. The CREATE Program is part of the Tri-Service Department of Defense (DoD) High Performance Computing Modernization Program (HPCMP). The HPCMP is executed by the US Army Corps of Engineers (USACE) Engineer Research and Development Center (ERDC) Information Technology Laboratory (ITL) in Vicksburg, Mississippi.

The charter of CREATE is to reduce the cost, time, and risks of DoD acquisition programs by developing and deploying multidisciplinary, physics-based software applications for the design and analysis of military aircraft, naval ships, and radio frequency antenna systems (expanded to include ground vehicles in 2012) by DoD engineering organizations.

The CREATE software product portfolio was established to enable physics-based virtual prototyping and testing analysis for major DoD acquisition programs and include the following program areas:

- Air vehicle design (AV)
- Foundational technologies (FT)
- Ground vehicle design (GV)
- Radio frequency antenna design (RF)
- Ship design (SH)
- Educational software (Genesis)

CREATE-AV – Air Vehicle Products

Kestrel – Fixed-wing Design and Analysis

High-fidelity, multi-disciplinary analysis platform supporting a wide range of coupled physics to include: aerodynamics, thermochemistry, structural dynamics, thermodynamics, propulsion and flight controls.

Helios – Rotorcraft Design and Analysis

High-fidelity aero-structural software for coupled CFD/CSD analysis of rotary-wing aircraft: aerodynamics, structural dynamics and trim, maneuver, interactional aerodynamics, and air-launched effects.

ADAPT - Aircraft Design, Analysis, Performance, and Trade-space

Multi-disciplinary Analysis and Optimization (MDAO) environment enabling designers to support DoD fixed-wing aircraft pre-program requirements development.

CREATE-FT – Foundational Technologies Product

Capstone – Geometry, Mesh and Attribution Generation

Software platform to create, modify, and query geometry mesh and attribution information to define a numerical representation (digital model) for physics-based simulation of complex engineering systems.

CREATE-GV – Ground Vehicle Product

Mercury – Ground Vehicle Design and Analysis

Integrates the physics domains of vehicle dynamics, powertrain, tire-soil and track-soil interaction, and driver and control models, enabling multiple performance tests such as ride quality, discrete-obstacle shock, soft-soil mobility, sand slope climbing, maximum speed, lane change stability, and circular turn stability.

CREATE-RF – Radio Frequency Antenna Products

SENTRi – Antenna Modeling, Design and Analysis

Modeling of complex structures, including highly heterogeneous material structures with multi-scaled features to include: dielectric, magnetic, impedance boundary conditions, and complex valued resistive sheets.

FLO-K – Antenna Rapid Design Tool

Rapid design tool for periodic structures such as frequency selective surfaces, phased array antennas and band gap structures, including full three-dimensional structures with dielectric, magnetic, and impedance sheets.

Aurora – Antenna Pattern Prediction Tool

Accurate prediction of antenna patterns for complex platform integration analysis.

CREATE-SH – Ships Products

RSDE – Concept Design

Concept design tool that allows for the assessment of a spectrum of competing performance parameters in ship design to include: range, speed, armament, aviation support, varying hull form size and shape, systems, structures, powering, and payloads.

IHDE – Integration, Design and Analysis

Enables the integration of a suite of hull form design and analysis tools for users to evaluate hydrodynamic performance (including visualization) in areas of resistance, seakeeping, hydrodynamic loads, and operability in the form of percent time operable (PTO).

NavyFOAM – Ship Modeling and Analysis

Enables high-fidelity hydrodynamic analysis and prediction of ship performance, including resistance, propulsion, maneuvering, seakeeping, and seaway loads.

NESM – Multi-physics Toolkit

Extends the Department of Energy Sandia National Laboratory's multi-physics toolkit, Sierra Mechanics, to provide a means to assess ship and component response to external shock and blast.

ISDE – Structural Analysis

A multi-fidelity structural analysis environment to address the inadequacies in current structural design tools by providing a computational data-bridge between structural concept design, first order assessments, and detailed FEA while introducing the design capabilities needed for future Navy requirements.

CREATE-Genesis – Tool Suite for Aerospace Education

Genesis CFD – Fluid Dynamics Analysis

Provides basic computational fluid dynamics analysis capabilities to include: single mesh unstructured Navier-Stokes solver (core count constrained), motion (prescribed and 6-DOF), modal model based aeroelastic structures, and 0-D linear engine model for propulsion boundary conditions.

Capstone – Geometry, Mesh and Attribution Generation

Software platform to create, modify, and query geometry mesh and attribution information to define a numerical representation (digital model) for physics-based simulation of complex engineering systems.

ADAPT - Aircraft Design, Analysis, Performance, and Trade-space

Multi-disciplinary Analysis and Optimization (MDAO) environment enabling designers to support DoD fixed-wing aircraft pre-program requirements development.

== Current and Former Program Directors ==
The following table summarizes the chronology of program directors.

| | Name | From | To |
|---|---|---|---|
| 1 | Anthony Pressley | 1992 | 1995 |
| 2 | Kay Howell | 1995 | 1997 |
| 3 | Tom Dunn | 1997 | 1998 |
| 4 | Charles Holland | 1998 | 1999 |
| 5 | Cray Henry | 2000 | Sep 2011 |
| 6 | John West | Oct 2011 | Dec 2014 |
| 7 | David Horner | Jan 2015 | Jan 2019 |
| 8 | Will McMahon | Jan 2019 | Jan 2022 |
| 9 | Jerry Ballard | Jan 2022 | Jan 2024 |
| 10 | Kevin Newmeyer (Acting) | Jan 2024 | Jan 2025 |
| 11 | Kelly Dalton | Jan 2025 | Present |

== The HPCMP in the DoD Budget ==
Since FY2012, the HPCMP's base funding has been provided on two lines in the Army budget, which is itself a portion of the Department of Defense Budget submitted each year by the President and approved by Congress. PE 0603461A provides for RDT&E funds that operate the centers and DREN, and funds R&D efforts in support of program goals. Line item number B66501 (line 103, BA 02, BSA 92) provides procurement funds for the annual purchase of new supercomputing hardware (both supercomputers and related systems).

Prior to FY2012, the HPCMP's RDT&E funding was provided on PE 0603755D8Z, while procurement was funded on PE 0902198D8Z (P011).

The following table summarizes requested and committee-approved funding amounts for the RDT&E portion of the program for the most recent federal fiscal years (procurement funding, which is supplied on a different line in the federal budget, is not included in this table).

Requested and approved HPCMP funding amounts, RDT&E (in millions of dollars).
| Fiscal Year | Program Element | Line | President's Request | Congress Approved | Difference |
|---|---|---|---|---|---|
| 2022 | 0603461A | 42 | $189.12 | $229.12 | +$40.0 |
| 2021 | 0603461A | 64 | $188.02 | $228.02 | +$40.0 |
| 2020 | 0603461A | 60 | $184.76 | $224.76 | +$40.0 |
| 2019 | 0603461A | 46 | $183.32 | $218.32 | +$35.0 |
| 2018 | 0603461A | 45 | $182.33 | $221.33 | +$39.0 |
| 2017 | 0603461A | 46 | $177.190 | $222.19 | +$45.0 |
| 2016 | 0603461A | 46 | $177.159 | $222.16 | +$45.0 |
| 2015 | 0603461A | 47 | $181.609 | $221.61 | +$40.0 |
| 2014 | 0603461A | 47 | $180.66 | $220.66 | +$40.0 |
| 2013 | 0603461A | 47 | $180.582 | $228.18 | +$47.6 |
| 2012 | 0603461A | 47 | $183.150 | $228.15 | +$45.0 |
| 2011 | 0603755D8Z | 52 | $200.986 | $255.49 | +$54.5 |
| 2010 | 0603755D8Z | 49 | $221.286 | $245.19 | +$23.9 |
| 2009 | 0603755D8Z | 49 | $208.079 | $220.345 | +$12.266 |
| 2008 | 0603755D8Z | 50 | $187.587 | $208.487 | +$20.9 |
| 2007 | 0603755D8Z | 43 | $175.313 | $207.213 | +$31.9 |
| 2006 | 0603755D8Z | 45 | $189.747 | $213.247 | +$23.5 |
| 2005 | 0603755D8Z | 42 | $186.666 | $236.766 | +$50.1 |
| 2004 | 0603755F | Project 5093 | $185.282 | $202.492 | +$17.21 |
| 2003 | 0603755D8Z | | $188.642 | $217.142 | +$28.5 |
| 2002 | 0603755D8Z | | $188.376 | $187.200 | -$1.2 |
| 2001 | 0603755D8Z | | $164.027 | $177.527 | +$13.5 |
| 2000 | 0603755D8Z | | $159.099 | $168.099 | +$9.0 |
| 1999 | 0603755D8Z | | $140.927 | $153.927 | +$13.0 |
| 1998 | 0603755D8Z | | $126.211 | $149.880 | +$23.67 |

The temporary change in Program Element number for FY2004 reflects a planned transition of the program from management by the Office of the Secretary of Defense to the Air Force; this transition did not ultimately occur.
