= Georgia Tourassi =

Physicist

Gina Tourassi
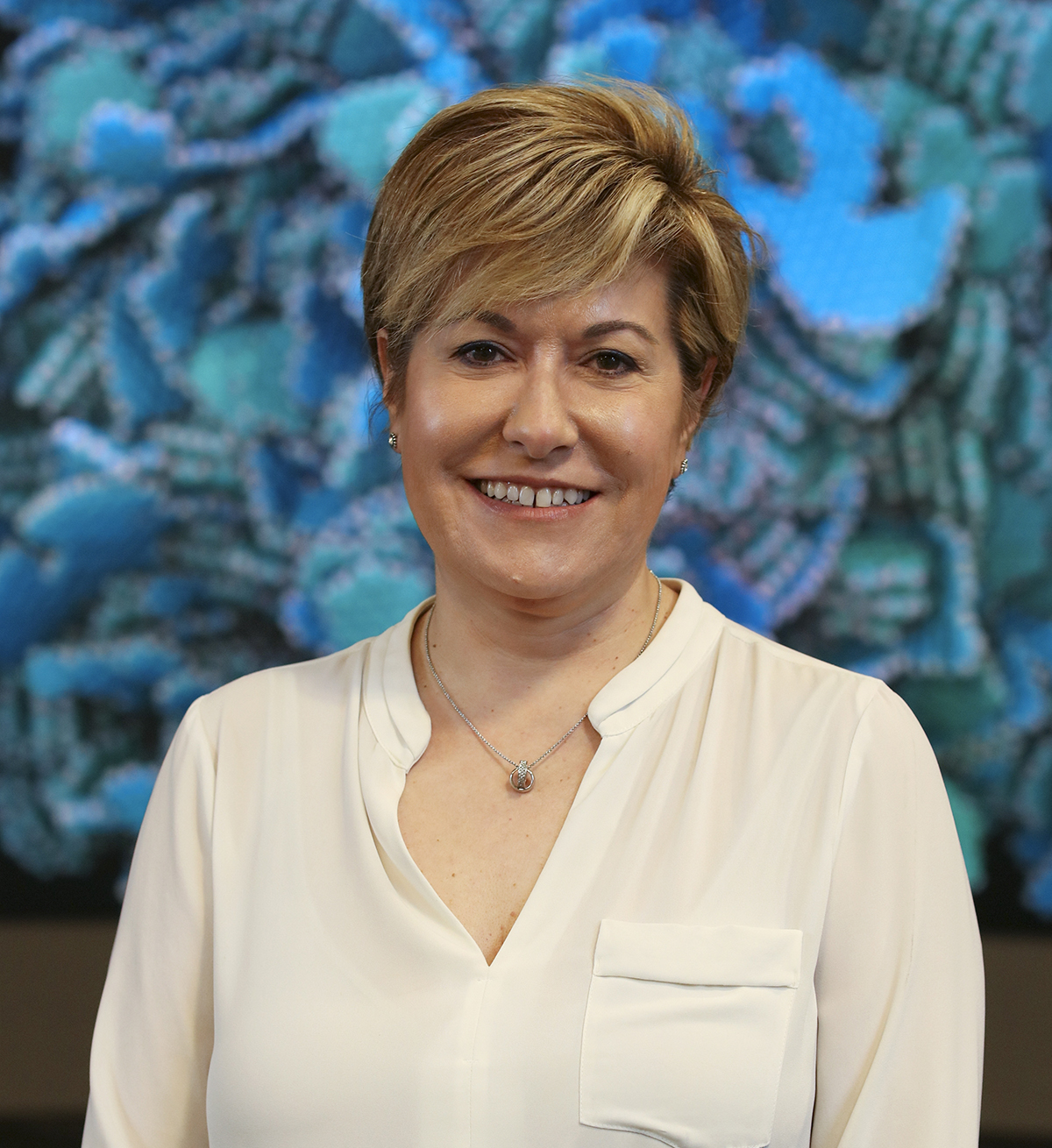
- Tourassi at Oak Ridge National Laboratory in 2017
- Born: Georgia D. Tourassi; Greece
- Education: Duke University (PhD); Aristotle University of Thessaloniki (BSc)
- Scientific career
- Fields: Biomedical informatics Computer-aided diagnosis Artificial intelligence
- Workplaces: Duke University; Oak Ridge National Laboratory
- Thesis: Artificial neural networks for image analysis and diagnosis in nuclear medicine (1993)
- Website: www.ornl.gov/staff-profile/georgia-tourassi

Georgia "Gina" D. Tourassi is the Director of the Oak Ridge National Laboratory health data sciences institute and adjunct Professor of radiology at Duke University. She works on biomedical informatics, computer-aided diagnosis and artificial intelligence (AI) in health care.

== Early life and education ==
Tourassi studied physics at Aristotle University of Thessaloniki and graduated in 1987. She moved to Duke University for her doctoral studies, and earned a PhD in 1993.

== Research and career ==
In 1988, Tourassi was appointed a postdoctoral research assistant at Duke University and promoted to associate professor of medical physics at Duke University Medical Center in 2006. Her research was supported by the National Institutes of Health (NIH) and the Whitaker Foundation. Her work uses big health data, in particular for epidemiology of cancer. This includes the use of artificial intelligence in nuclear medicine, as well as computer-aided diagnosis (CAD) in breast cancer screening. Her CAD systems is interactive, knowledge based and uses information theory. She has also developed indexing systems to speed-up image analysis, techniques to monitor the reliability of CAD and advanced computational intelligence techniques, including genetic algorithms. Her knowledge-based approach uses image entropy to sort through hundreds of medical images, identifies the ones that are most informative and flag cancer indicators. Tourassi was elected a member of the Food and Drug Administration (FDA) advisory committee on computer-aided diagnosis (CAD).

Tourassi joined Oak Ridge National Laboratory in 2011. She is the Founding Director of the Health Data Sciences Institute, where she manages the strategic agenda of the biomedical science and computing group. She has hosted a range of biomedical research conferences at the Oak Ridge National Laboratory. Tourassi is interested in automated tools to extract and process data for cancer surveillance. The Oak Ridge National Laboratory is home to the Titan supercomputer which is used for deep learning to automate the extraction of information from cancer pathology reports as part of Cancer Moonshot 2020. Tourassi predicts that automated data tools will permit medical researchers and policy makers to identify overlooked cancer research, as well as investing in promising technology. She uses artificial intelligence to avoid context bias in interpretation of mammograms.

Tourassi developed a user-oriented web crawler, iCrawl, that collects online content for e-health research. She also worked on Oak Ridge Graph Analytics for Medical Innovation (ORiGAMI), a data tool to help diagnostics and research. Tourassi used ORiGAMI to explore literature related to genomics. She was part of a team that developed a knowledge graph that allows extraction of meaningful information from unstructured data. Similar to the recommendation approaches of Netflix, Tourassi's tool combines large-scale graph analytics with machine learning.

Tourassi is an advocate for women and minorities in science and engineering. She is involved with the Oak Ridge National Laboratory women's mentorship program. She is a member of The Bredesen Centre.

=== Awards and honours ===
- 2015 Fellow of the American Institute for Medical and Biological Engineering
- 2015 Fellow of American Association of Physicists in Medicine
- 2016 United States Department of Energy Secretary's Appreciation Award
- 2017 HPCwire Readers’ and Editors’ Choice Award
- 2017 Fellow of the SPIE
- 2018 Oak Ridge National Laboratory Director's Award
- 2018 Oak Ridge National Laboratory Distinguished Researcher award
- 2019 Co-Chair of the SPIE Medical Imaging Conference
- 2020 Chair of the SPIE Medical Imaging Conference
