= Cray XT5 =

Family of supercomputers

- Active: November 6, 2007
- Operators: Oak Ridge National Laboratories
- Operating system: Cray Linux Environment
- Ranking: TOP500
- Sources: top500.org

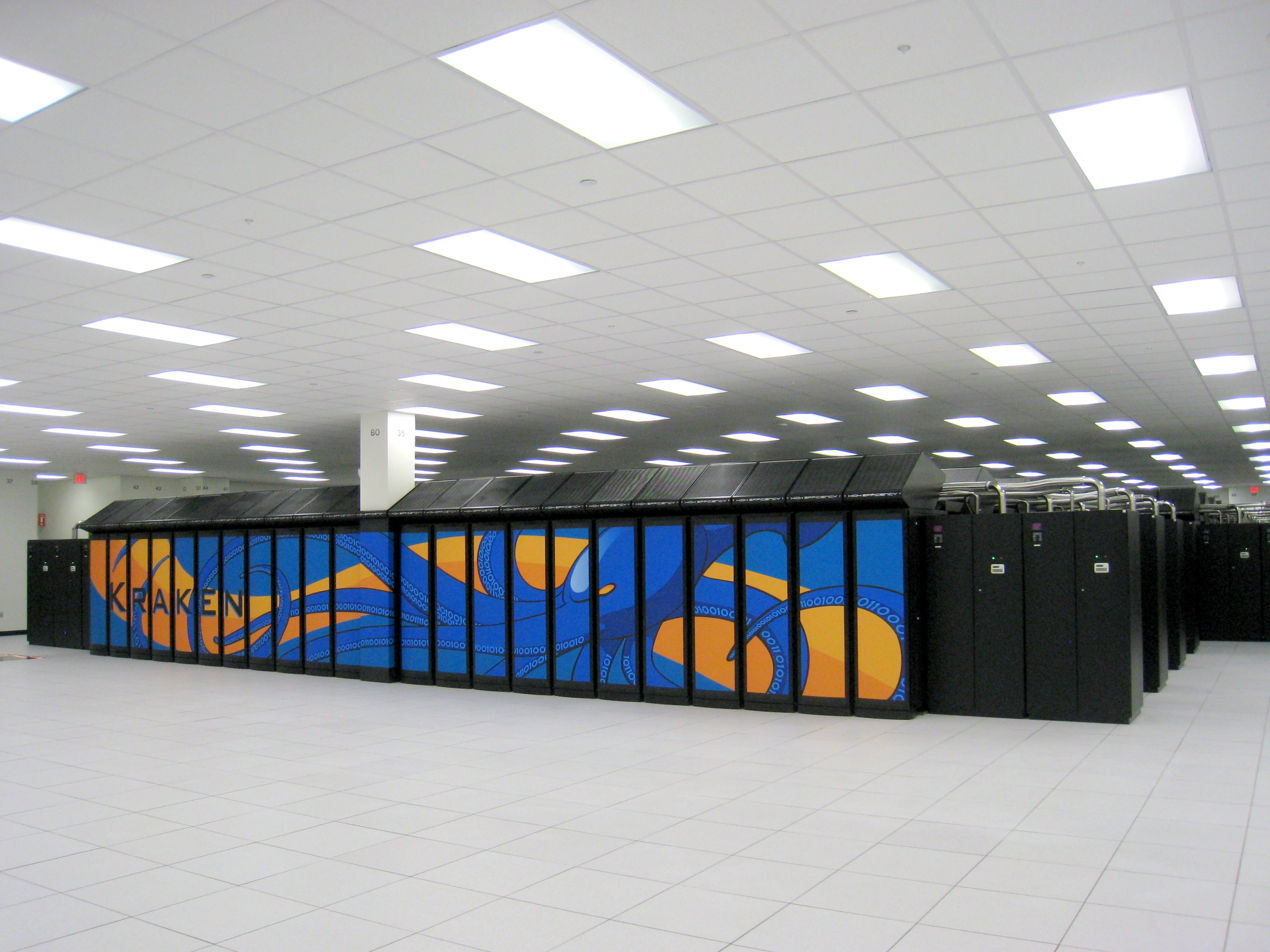
Kraken, a Cray XT5 supercomputer at National Institute for Computational Sciences at Oak Ridge National Laboratory

The Cray XT5 is an updated version of the Cray XT4 supercomputer, launched on November 6, 2007. It includes a faster version of the XT4's SeaStar2 interconnect router called SeaStar2+, and can be configured either with XT4 compute blades, which have four dual-core AMD Opteron processor sockets, or XT5 blades, with eight sockets supporting dual or quad-core Opterons. The XT5 uses a 3-dimensional torus network topology.

== XT5 family ==
The XT5 family run the Cray Linux Environment, formerly known as UNICOS/lc. This incorporates SUSE Linux Enterprise Server and Cray's Compute Node Linux.

The XT5h (hybrid) variant also includes support for Cray X2 vector processor blades, and Cray XR1 blades which combine Opterons with FPGA-based Reconfigurable Processor Units (RPUs) provided by DRC Computer Corporation.

The XT5m variant is a mid-ranged supercomputer with most of the features of the XT5, but having a 2-dimensional torus network topology and scalable to 6 cabinets.

In the fall of 2008, Cray delivered the Jaguar 1.3 petaflops XT5 system to National Center for Computational Sciences at Oak Ridge National Laboratory. The system, with over 150,000 processing cores, was the second fastest system in the world for the LINPACK benchmark, the fastest system available for open science and the first system to exceed a petaflops sustained performance on a 64-bit scientific application.

Jaguar underwent an upgrade to 224,256 cores in 2009, after which its performance jumped to 1.75 petaflops, taking it to the number one position in the 34th edition of the TOP500 list in fall 2009. It remained number one in the June 2010 edition, but in October 2010 was surpassed by the Chinese Tianhe-1A, which achieved a performance of 2.57 petaflops.

Another XT5 system, Kraken, with 112,896 cores and 1.17 petaflops, as of June 2012 was at position number 21 in the TOP500 list.
