= Peloton (supercomputer) =

Supercomputer purchase program

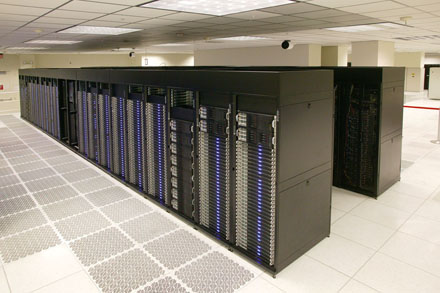
The Atlas cluster

The Peloton supercomputer purchase was a program at the Lawrence Livermore National Laboratory intended to provide tera-FLOP computing capability using commodity Scalable Units (SUs). The Peloton RFP defined the system configurations.

Appro was awarded the contract for Peloton which included the following machines:

Machine	Nodes	TPP (TFLops)
atlas	1152	44.24
hopi	80	2.92
minos	864	33.18
rhea	576	22.12
yana	80	3.07
zeus	288	11.06

All of the machines ran the CHAOS variant of Red Hat Enterprise Linux and the Moab resource management system. Under the project management of John Lee, the team at Synnex, Voltaire, Supermicro and other suppliers, the scientists were able to dramatically reduce the amount of time it took to go from starting the cluster build to actually having hardware at Livermore in production. In particular, it went from having four SUs on the floor on a Thursday, to bringing in two more SUs for the final cluster and by Saturday, having all of them wired up, burned in, and running Linpack.

The last Peloton clusters were retired in June 2012.
